= Baroclinic instabilities in the ocean =

Fluid dynamical instability

A baroclinic instability is a fluid dynamical instability of fundamental importance in the atmosphere and ocean. It can lead to the formation of transient mesoscale eddies, with a horizontal scale of 10–100 km. In contrast, flows on the largest scale in the ocean are described as ocean currents, the largest scale eddies are mostly created by shearing of two ocean currents and static mesoscale eddies are formed by the flow around an obstacle (as seen in the animation on eddy (fluid dynamics). Mesoscale eddies are circular currents with swirling motion and account for approximately 90% of the ocean's total kinetic energy. Therefore, they are key in mixing and transport of for example heat, salt and nutrients.

In a baroclinic medium, the density depends on both the temperature and pressure. The effect of the temperature on the density allows lines of equal density (isopycnals) and lines of equal pressure (isobars) to intersect. This is in contrast to a barotropic fluid, in which the density is only a function of pressure. For this barotropic case, isobars and isopycnals are parallel. The intersecting of isobars and isopycnals in a baroclinic medium may cause baroclinic instabilities to occur by the process of sloping convection. The sizes of baroclinic instabilities and therefore also the eddies they create scale with the Rossby radius of deformation, which strongly varies with latitude for the ocean.

== Instability and eddy generation ==
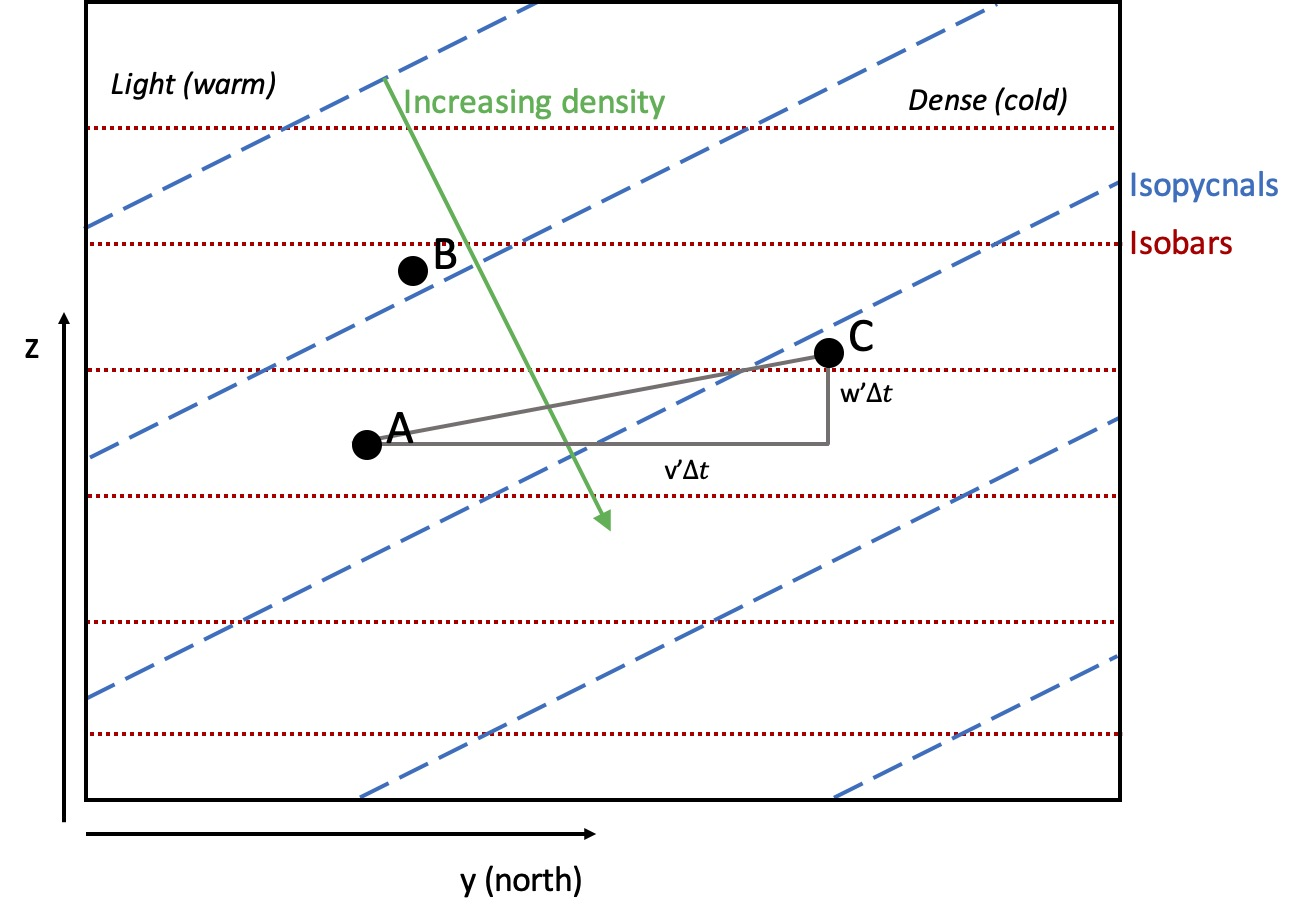
A schematic on a baroclinic fluid with sloping isopycnals, intersecting with isobars on the Northern hemisphere, showing the process of sloping convection and formation of a baroclinic instability. When a fluid parcel is perturbed from its steady state location A to location B, it will be surrounded by a fluid with a lower density and the parcel will sink down to its original equilibrium location; the fluid parcel is now stable. However, when a parcel is displaced to location C, it is surrounded by fluid with a higher density than the parcel itself. The parcel will now float up even further, a small perturbation grows into a larger one and a baroclinic instability is formed.

In a baroclinic fluid, the thermal-wind balance holds, which is a combination of the geostrophic balance and the hydrostatic balance. This implies that isopycnals can slope with respect to the isobars. Furthermore, this also results in changing horizontal velocities with height as a result of horizontal temperature and therefore density gradients.

Under the thermal-wind balance, geostrophic balance and hydrostatic balance, a flow is in equilibrium. However, this is not the equilibrium of least energy. A reduction in slope of the isopycnals would lower the center of gravity and therefore also the potential energy. It would also reduce the pressure gradient, leading to an increase in the kinetic energy. However, under the thermal-wind balance, a decrease in slope of the isopycnals cannot occur spontaneously. It requires a change of potential vorticity. Under certain conditions, slight perturbations of the equilibrium under the thermal-wind balance may increase, leading to larger perturbations from the initial state and thus the growth of an instability.

It is often considered that baroclinic instability is the mechanism which extracts potential energy stored in horizontal density gradients and uses this "eddy potential energy" to drive eddies.

=== Sloping convection ===
These baroclinic instabilities may be initiated by the process of 'sloping convection' or 'slanted thermal convection'. To understand this, consider a fluid in steady state and under the thermal-wind balance. Initially, a fluid parcel is at location A. The fluid parcel is slightly perturbed to location B, while still retaining its original density. Therefore, the fluid parcel is now in a location with a lower density than itself and the parcel will just sink down to its original position; the fluid parcel is now stable. However, when a parcel displaced to location C, it is surrounded by fluid with a higher density than the parcel itself. Due to its relatively low density with respect to its surroundings, the parcel will float up even further. Now a small perturbation grows into a larger one, which implies a baroclinic instability.

A criterion for an instability to occur can be defined. As stated before, in a baroclinic fluid, the thermal-wind balance holds, which implies the following two relations:

$$\begin{align}
\frac{\partial v}{\partial z} = \frac{g}{\rho f} \frac{\partial \rho}{\partial x}
\end{align}$$
and
$$\begin{align}
\frac{\partial u}{\partial z} = - \frac{g}{\rho f} \frac{\partial \rho}{\partial y}
\end{align}$$,

where $\rho$ is the density and $x$, $y$ and $z$ are the spatial coordinates in the horizontal (latitudinal and longitudinal) and vertical direction, respectively. $u$ and $v$ represent the horizontal (zonal and meridional) components of the velocity vector $\bold{u}$ in the $x$- and $y$-direction, respectively. Now thus $\frac{\partial \rho}{\partial x}$ and $\frac{\partial \rho}{\partial y}$ are the two horizontal density gradients. $g$ is the gravitational acceleration at the surface of the Earth and $f$ the Coriolis parameter.

Therefore a horizontal density gradient in the $y$-direction $\left( \frac{\partial \rho}{\partial y} \right)$ leads to a gradient in horizontal flow velocity $u$ over depth $\left( \frac{\partial u}{\partial z} \right)$.

The slope of the displacement is defined as

$\frac{\Delta z}{\Delta y} = \frac{w' \Delta t}{v' \Delta t} = \frac{w'}{v'}$,

where $v'$ and $w'$ are the horizontal and vertical velocities of the perturbation, respectively.

An instability now occurs when the slope of the displacement is smaller than the slope of the isopycnals. The isopycnals can be mathematically described as $z = H + \bar{a}$. Now this results in an instability when:

$$\begin{align}
\frac{d\bar{a}}{d y} > \frac{w'}{v'}.
\end{align}$$

From now on, only a two layer system with $U_1$ and $U_2$ the slopes of the top and bottom layer, respectively, is considered to simplify the problem. This is now similar to the classic Philips model. From the thermal-wind balance it now follows that

$$\begin{align}
\frac{d\bar{a}}{d y} = \frac{f_0}{g'}\left( U_1-U_2 \right),
\end{align}$$

where $g' = \frac{g(\rho_2-\rho_1)}{\rho_0}$ is the reduced gravity and $f_0$ the Coriolis-parameter at the equator according to the beta-plane approximation.

Performing a scale analysis on the slope of the perturbation allows to assign physical quantities to this mathematical problem. This now results in

$$\begin{align}
\frac{w'}{v'} \sim \frac{H}{L}\frac{U_1-U_2}{f_0L} \sim \frac{H}{L} \frac{\beta_0 L}{f_0}
\end{align}$$,

where $H$ is the scale height, $L$ the horizontal length scale, and $\beta_0$ is the Rossby-parameter.

From this it can be stated that an instability occurs when

$$\begin{align}
\frac{f_0^2L^2}{g'H} > 1
\end{align}$$
or
$$\begin{align}
\frac{f_0^2}{g'H}\frac{\Delta U}{\beta_0} > 1
\end{align}$$,

where $g' = \frac{g(\rho_2-\rho_1)}{\rho_0}$ is the reduced gravity and $\Delta U = U_2 - U_1$ is the velocity difference between the lower and upper layer. This criterion can be used to identify whether a small perturbation will grow into a larger one and thus whether an instability is expected to occur. From this it follows that you need some kind of shear $\Delta U$ to obtain an instability, it is easier to get an instability for long waves (perturbations) with large $L$, and the $\beta_0$ and therefore the beta-effect is stabilizing.

Furthermore, for the baroclinic Rossby radius of deformation it holds that $R \sim \frac{\sqrt{g'H}}{f_0}$. Now the instability criteria simplify to

$$\begin{align}
L \gtrsim R
\end{align}$$
or
$$\begin{align}
\Delta U \gtrsim \beta_0 R^2
\end{align}$$.

From this analysis it also follows that baroclinic instabilities are important for small Rossby numbers, where $Ro = \frac{U}{Lf}$.

== Observations of Baroclinic instabilities and eddies ==
Recently, many observations on mesoscale eddies in the ocean have been made using sea surface height data from altimeters. It has been shown that regions with the highest growth rate of baroclinic instabilities indeed match the regions which are rich in eddies. Furthermore, also the trajectories of both cyclonic and anticyclonic eddies can be studied. From this it follows that there are approximately the same number of cyclonic and anticyclonic eddies observed and therefore it is concluded that the generation of these two types is very similar. However, when considering longer lived eddies, they found that anticyclonic eddies clearly dominate. This implies that cyclonic eddies are less stable and therefore decay more rapidly. In addition, there are no eddies present above shallows in the ocean due to topographic steering as a result of the Taylor–Proudman theorem. Lastly, extremely long lived eddies with lifetimes over 1.5 to 2 years are only found in gyres, most likely because the background flow is small here.

Four different types of Baroclinic instabilities can be distinguished:

- Eady type
- Charney surface type
- Charney bottom type
- Phillips type

These four types are based on classical models (the classic Eady Model, the Charney model, and the Phillips model, respectively), but can also be distinguished from observations. Overall, from the observed baroclinic instabilities 47% is the Charney surface type, 33% the Phillips type, 13% the Eady type and only 7% the Charney bottom type. These different types of Baroclinic instabilities all lead to different types of eddies. Important here is ψ, which is the absolute value of the complex eigenfunction of the stream function of the horizontal velocity. It represents the vertical structure of the Baroclinic instability and ranges from 0, which implies a very low chance of an instability of this type and thus also eddy to form, to 1, which means a high chance.

The Eady type has a maximum ψ of one at the top and bottom, and a minimum around 0.5 halfway the total depth. For this type of model, an eddy thus occurs at both the surface and bottom of the ocean. It is therefore also called the surface- and bottom-intensified type and found mainly at high latitudes. The Charney surface type is surface-intensified and has a maximum ψ at the surface, whereas the Charney bottom type only shows baroclinic instabilities at the bottom. For the Charney bottom type ψ is also at the surface and increases to one over increasing depth. The Charney surface type is found in the subtropics, whereas the Charney bottom type is present at high latitudes. Lastly, for the Phillips type, ψ is zero at the surface, strongly increases to one just below the surface, and then slowly decreases again to zero for increasing depths. The location of these Phillips type instabilities agree with the occurrence of subsurface eddies, again supporting the idea that the Baroclinic instabilities lead to the formation of eddies. They are mostly found in the tropics and the eastern return flow of the subtropical gyres.

It was found that the type of Baroclinic instability present also depends on the mean background flow. An Eady type is preferred for a strong eastward mean flow in the upper ocean, and a weak westward flow in the deeper ocean. For the Charney bottom type this is similar, but now the westward flow in the deeper ocean is found to be stronger. The Charney surface and Phillips types exist for weaker background flows, also explaining why these are dominant in the ocean gyres.
