= Rossby-gravity waves =

Equatorially trapped waves that carry energy eastwards

Rossby-gravity waves are equatorially trapped waves (much like Kelvin waves), meaning that they rapidly decay as their distance increases away from the equator (so long as the Brunt–Vaisala frequency does not remain constant). These waves have the same trapping scale as Kelvin waves, more commonly known as the equatorial Rossby deformation radius. They always carry energy eastward, but their 'crests' and 'troughs' may propagate westward if their periods are long enough.

== Derivation ==
The eastward speed of propagation of these waves can be derived for an inviscid slowly moving layer of fluid of uniform depth H. Because the Coriolis parameter (f = 2Ω sin(θ) where Ω is the angular velocity of the earth, 7.2921 × 10^{−5} rad/s, and θ is latitude) vanishes at 0 degrees latitude (equator), the “equatorial beta plane” approximation must be made (this is equivalent to the small angle approximation for sinθ). This approximation states that f is approximately equal to βy, where y is the distance from the equator and β is the variation of the Coriolis parameter with latitude, $\frac{\partial f}{\partial y} = \beta$. With the inclusion of this approximation, the primitive equations become (neglecting friction):

- the continuity equation (accounting for the effects of horizontal convergence and divergence and written with geopotential height):
  $$\frac{\partial \phi}{\partial t} + c^2 \left ( \frac{\partial v}{\partial y} + \frac{\partial u}{\partial x} \right ) = 0$$
- the U-momentum equation (zonal wind component):
  $$\frac{\partial u}{\partial t} - v \beta y = -\frac{\partial \phi}{\partial x}$$
- the V-momentum equation (meridional wind component):
  $$\frac{\partial v}{\partial t} + u \beta y = -\frac{\partial \phi}{\partial y}$$

These three equations can be separated and solved using solutions in the form of zonally propagating waves, which are analogous to exponential solutions with a dependence on x and t and the inclusion of structure functions that vary in the y-direction:

$$\begin{Bmatrix}u, v, \phi \end{Bmatrix} = \begin{Bmatrix}\hat u(y), \hat v(y), \hat \phi(y) \end{Bmatrix} e^{i(k x - \omega t)}$$

Once the frequency relation is formulated in terms of ω, the angular frequency, the problem can be solved with three distinct solutions. These three solutions correspond to the equatorially trapped gravity wave, the equatorially trapped Rossby wave and the mixed Rossby-gravity wave (which has some of the characteristics of the former two) . Equatorial gravity waves can be either westward- or eastward-propagating, and correspond to n=1 (same as for the equatorially trapped Rossby wave) on a dispersion relation diagram ("w-k" diagram). At n = 0 on a dispersion relation diagram, the mixed Rossby-gravity waves can be found where for large, positive zonal wave numbers (+k), the solution behaves like a gravity wave; but for large, negative zonal wave numbers (−k), the solution appears to be a Rossby wave (hence the term Rossby-gravity waves). As mentioned earlier, the group velocity (or energy packet/dispersion) is always directed toward the east with a maximum for short waves (gravity waves).

== Vertically propagating Rossby-gravity waves ==
As previously stated, the mixed Rossby-gravity waves are equatorially trapped waves unless the buoyancy frequency remains constant, introducing an additional vertical wave number to complement the zonal wave number and angular frequency. If this Brunt–Vaisala frequency does not change, then these waves become vertically propagating solutions. On a typical "m,k" dispersion diagram, the group velocity (energy) would be directed at right angles to the n = 0 (mixed Rossby-gravity waves) and n = 1 (gravity or Rossby waves) curves and would increase in the direction of increasing angular frequency. Typical group velocities for each component are the following: 1 cm/s for gravity waves and 2 mm/s for planetary (Rossby) waves.

These vertically propagating mixed Rossby-gravity waves were first observed in the stratosphere as westward-propagating mixed waves by M. Yanai. They had the following characteristics: 4–5 days, horizontal wavenumbers of 4 (four waves circling the earth, corresponding to wavelengths of 10,000 km), vertical wavelengths of 4–8 km, and upward group velocity. Similarly, westward-propagating mixed waves were also found in the Atlantic Ocean by Weisberg et al. (1979) with periods of 31 days, horizontal wavelengths of 1200 km, vertical wavelengths of 1 km, and downward group velocity. Also, the vertically propagating gravity wave component was found in the stratosphere with periods of 35 hours, horizontal wavelengths of 2400 km, and vertical wavelengths of 5 km.

== See also ==
- Rossby wave
- Equatorial Rossby wave
