= Equatorial wave =

Ocean waves trapped close to the equator

Equatorial waves are oceanic and atmospheric waves trapped close to the equator, meaning that they decay rapidly away from the equator, but can propagate in the longitudinal and vertical directions. Wave trapping is the result of the Earth's rotation and its spherical shape which combine to cause the magnitude of the Coriolis force to increase rapidly away from the equator. Equatorial waves are present in both the tropical atmosphere and ocean and play an important role in the evolution of many climate phenomena such as El Niño. Many physical processes may excite equatorial waves including, in the case of the atmosphere, diabatic heat release associated with cloud formation, and in the case of the ocean, anomalous changes in the strength or direction of the trade winds.

Equatorial waves may be separated into a series of subclasses depending on their fundamental dynamics (which also influences their typical periods and speeds and directions of propagation). At shortest periods are the equatorial gravity waves while the longest periods are associated with the equatorial Rossby waves. In addition to these two extreme subclasses, there are two special subclasses of equatorial waves known as the mixed Rossby-gravity wave (also known as the Yanai wave) and the equatorial Kelvin wave. The latter two share the characteristics that they can have any period and also that they may carry energy only in an eastward (never westward) direction.

The remainder of this article discusses the relationship between the period of these waves, their wavelength in the zonal (east-west) direction and their speeds for a simplified ocean.

== Equatorial Rossby and Rossby-gravity waves ==
Rossby-gravity waves, first observed in the stratosphere by M. Yanai, always carry energy eastward. But, oddly, their 'crests' and 'troughs' may propagate westward if their periods are long enough. The eastward speed of propagation of these waves can be derived for an inviscid slowly moving layer of fluid of uniform depth H. Because the Coriolis parameter (ƒ = 2Ω sin(θ) where Ω is the angular velocity of the earth, 7.2921 $\times$ 10^{−5} rad/s, and θ is latitude) vanishes at 0 degrees latitude (equator), the “equatorial beta plane” approximation must be made. This approximation states that “f” is approximately equal to βy, where “y” is the distance from the equator and "β" is the variation of the coriolis parameter with latitude, $\frac{\partial f}{\partial y} = \beta$.

With the inclusion of this approximation, the governing equations become (neglecting friction):

- the continuity equation (accounting for the effects of horizontal convergence and divergence and written with geopotential height):
  $$\frac{\partial \phi}{\partial t} + c^2 \left ( \frac{\partial v}{\partial y} + \frac{\partial u}{\partial x} \right ) = 0$$
- the U-momentum equation (zonal wind component):
  $$\frac{\partial u}{\partial t} - v \beta y = -\frac{\partial \phi}{\partial x}$$
- the V-momentum equation (meridional wind component):
  $$\frac{\partial v}{\partial t} + u \beta y = -\frac{\partial \phi}{\partial y}$$

We may seek travelling-wave solutions of the form:
$$\begin{Bmatrix}u, v, \phi \end{Bmatrix} = \begin{Bmatrix}\hat u(y), \hat v(y), \hat \phi(y) \end{Bmatrix} e^{i(k x - \omega t)}$$

Substituting this exponential form into the three equations above, and eliminating $u,$ and $\phi$ leaves us with an eigenvalue equation:
$$-\frac{\partial^2\hat  v}{\partial y^2}  +\left(\frac{\beta^2}{c^2}\right)y^2\, \hat v= \left( \frac{\omega^2}{c^2} -k^2 -\frac{\beta k}{\omega}\right)\hat  v.$$
for $\hat v(y)$.

Recognizing this as the Schrödinger equation for a quantum harmonic oscillator of frequency $\Omega=\beta/c$, we know that we must have:
$$\left( \frac{\omega^2}{c^2} -k^2 -\frac{\beta k}{\omega}\right)  =  \frac{\beta}{c}(2n+1), \quad n\ge 0$$
for the solutions to tend to zero away from the equator. For each integer $n$ therefore, this last equation provides a dispersion relation linking the wavenumber $k$ to the angular frequency $\omega$.

In the special case $n=0$ the dispersion equation reduces to:
$$(\omega+ck)(\omega^2 -c k\omega -c \beta)=0,$$
but the root $\omega=-ck$ has to be discarded because we had to divide by this factor in eliminating $u$, $\phi$. The remaining pair of roots correspond to the Yanai or mixed Rossby-gravity mode whose group velocity is always to the east and interpolates between two types of $n> 0$ modes: the higher frequency Poincaré gravity waves whose group velocity can be to the east or to the west, and the low-frequency equatorial Rossby waves whose dispersion relation can be approximated as:
$$\omega = \frac{- \beta k}{k^2+ \beta(2n+1)/c}.$$

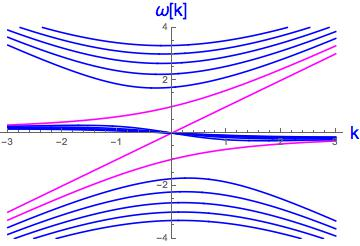
Dispersion relations for equatorial waves with different values of $n$: The dense narrow band of low-frequency Rossby waves and the higher frequency Poincaré gravity waves are in blue. The topologically protected Kelvin and Yanai modes are highlighted in magenta

The Yanai modes, together with the Kelvin waves described in the next section, are rather special in that they are topologically protected. Their existence is guaranteed by the fact that the band of positive frequency Poincaré modes in the f-plane form a non-trivial bundle over the two-sphere $\sqrt{{\bf k}^2+ f^2}=1$. This bundle is characterized by Chern number $c_1= 2$. The Rossby waves have $c_1= 0$, and the negative frequency Poincaré modes have $c_1= -2.$ Through the bulk-boundary connection this necessitates the existence of two modes (Kelvin and Yanai) that cross the frequency gaps between the Poincaré and Rossby bands and are localized near the equator where $f=\beta y$ changes sign.

== Equatorial Kelvin waves ==
Discovered by Lord Kelvin, coastal Kelvin waves are trapped close to coasts and propagate along coasts in the Northern Hemisphere such that the coast is to the right of the alongshore direction of propagation (and to the left in the Southern Hemisphere). Equatorial Kelvin waves behave somewhat as if there were a wall at the equator – so that the equator is to the right of the direction of along-equator propagation in the Northern Hemisphere and to the left of the direction of propagation in the Southern Hemisphere, both of which are consistent with eastward propagation along the equator. The governing equations for these equatorial waves are similar to those presented above, except that there is no meridional velocity component, $v(y)$ (that is, no flow in the north–south direction).

- the continuity equation (accounting for the effects of horizontal convergence and divergence):
  $$\frac{\partial \phi}{\partial t} + c^2 \frac{\partial u}{\partial x} = 0$$
- the u-momentum equation (zonal wind component):
  $$\frac{\partial u}{\partial t} = -\frac{\partial \phi}{\partial x}$$
- the v-momentum equation (meridional wind component):
  $$u \beta y = -\frac{\partial \phi}{\partial y}.$$

The solution to these equations yields the following phase speed: $c^2 = g H$; this result is the same speed as for shallow-water gravity waves without the effect of Earth's rotation. Therefore, these waves are non-dispersive (because the phase speed is not a function of the zonal wavenumber). Also, these Kelvin waves only propagate towards the east (because as Φ approaches zero, y approaches infinity).

Like other waves, equatorial Kelvin waves can transport energy and momentum but not particles and particle properties like temperature, salinity or nutrients.

== Connection to El Niño Southern Oscillation ==
Kelvin waves have been connected to El Niño (beginning in the Northern Hemisphere winter months) in recent years in terms of precursors to this atmospheric and oceanic phenomenon. Many scientists have utilized coupled atmosphere–ocean models to simulate an El Niño Southern Oscillation (ENSO) event and have stated that the Madden–Julian oscillation (MJO) can trigger oceanic Kelvin waves throughout its 30- to 60-day cycle or the latent heat of condensation can be released (from intense convection) resulting in Kelvin waves as well; this process can then signal the onset of an El Niño event. The weak low pressure in the Indian Ocean (due to the MJO) typically propagates eastward into the North Pacific Ocean and can produce easterly winds. These easterly winds can force West Pacific warm surface water eastwards, and also excite Kelvin waves, which in this sense can be thought of as warm-water anomalies that affect the top few hundred metres of the ocean. As the surface warm water is less dense than the underlying watermasses, this increased thickness of the near surface thermocline results in a slight rise in sea surface height of about 8 cm.

Changes associated with the waves and currents can be tracked using an array of 70 moorings which cover the equatorial Pacific Ocean from Papua New Guinea to the Ecuador coast. Sensors on the moorings measure the sea temperature at different depths and this is then sent by satellite to ground stations where the data can be analysed and used to predict the possible development of the next El Niño.

During the strongest El Niños the strength of the cold Equatorial Undercurrent drops as does the trade wind in the eastern Pacific. As a result cold water is no longer upwelled along the Equator in the eastern Pacific, resulting in a large increase of sea surface temperatures and a corresponding sharp rise in sea surface height near the Galapagos Islands. The resulting increase in sea surface temperatures also affects the waters off the South American coast (specifically Ecuador), and can also influence temperatures southward along the coast of Peru and north towards Central America and Mexico, and may reach parts of Northern California.

The overall ENSO cycle is usually explained as follows (in terms of the wave propagation and assuming that waves can transport heat): ENSO begins with a warm pool travelling from the western Pacific to the eastern Pacific in the form of Kelvin waves (the waves carry the warm SSTs) that resulted from the MJO. After approximately 3 to 4 months of propagation across the Pacific (along the equatorial region), the Kelvin waves reach the western coast of South America and interact (merge/mix) with the cooler Peru current system. This causes a rise in sea levels and sea level temperatures in the general region. Upon reaching the coast, the water turns to the north and south and results in El Niño conditions to the south. Because of the changes in sea-level and sea-temperature due to the Kelvin waves, an infinite number of Rossby waves are generated and move back over the Pacific. Rossby waves then enter the equation and, as previously stated, move at lower velocities than the Kelvin waves and can take anywhere from nine months to four years to fully cross the Pacific Ocean basin (from boundary to boundary). And because these waves are equatorial in nature, they decay rapidly as distance from the equator increases; thus, as they move away from the equator, their speed decreases as well, resulting in a wave delay. When the Rossby waves reach the western Pacific they ricochet off the coast and become Kelvin waves and then propagate back across the Pacific in the direction of the South America coast. Upon return, however, the waves decrease the sea-level (reducing the depression in the thermocline) and sea surface temperature, thereby returning the area to normal or sometimes La Niña conditions.

In terms of climate modeling and upon coupling the atmosphere and the ocean, an ENSO model typically contains the following dynamical equations:

- 3 primitive equations for the atmosphere (as mentioned above) with the inclusion of frictional parameterizations: 1) u-momentum equation, 2) v-momentum equation, and 3) continuity equation
- 4 primitive equations for the ocean (as stated below) with the inclusion of frictional parameterizations:
  - u-momentum,
    $$\frac{\partial u}{\partial t} - v \beta y = \frac{\tau_x}{\rho h},$$
  - v-momentum,
    $$\frac{\partial v}{\partial t} - u \beta y = \frac{\tau_y}{\rho h},$$
  - continuity,
    $$\frac{\partial h}{\partial t} + h \left ( \frac{\partial u}{\partial x} + \frac{\partial v}{\partial y} \right ) - K_E T = 0,$$
  - thermodynamic energy,
    $$\frac{\partial T}{\partial t} + u\frac{\partial T}{\partial x} - K_T h = 0.$$

Note that h is the depth of the fluid (similar to the equivalent depth and analogous to H in the primitive equations listed above for Rossby-gravity and Kelvin waves), K_{T} is temperature diffusion, K_{E} is eddy diffusivity, and τ is the wind stress in either the x or y directions.

== See also ==
- Primitive equations
- Beta plane
- Rossby wave
- El Niño
- Equatorial Rossby wave
