= F-plane =

Approximation in geophysical fluid dynamics

The f-plane (blue) is tangent to a rotating planet at latitude $\varphi_0$, with $x$ pointing east, $y$ north, and $z$ up. There the planet's rotation vector $\boldsymbol{\Omega}$ has a local vertical component $\Omega\sin\varphi_0$ and a local northward component $\Omega\cos\varphi_0$. The f-plane keeps only the vertical component, through the constant Coriolis parameter $f_0 = 2\Omega\sin\varphi_0$.

In geophysical fluid dynamics, the f-plane is a model of flow on a limited part of a rotating planet in which the Coriolis parameter $f$ is treated as a constant. The flow is described in Cartesian coordinates on a plane tangent to the planet's surface, and $f$ keeps the value it has at the latitude where the plane touches the surface. This f-plane approximation is valid when the flow spans such a narrow range of latitudes that the variation of the Coriolis parameter is negligible.

The f-plane retains the effects of rotation that do not depend on the planet's curvature, such as geostrophic balance, inertia–gravity waves, and Kelvin waves. It leaves out the effects of the change of $f$ with latitude, known as the beta effect, such as planetary Rossby waves. The beta plane, on which $f$ varies linearly with distance to the north, is the next approximation and restores them.

== Definition ==
On a planet that rotates with angular velocity $\Omega$, the Coriolis parameter at latitude $\varphi$ is
$$f = 2\Omega\sin\varphi.$$
It is positive in the Northern Hemisphere and negative in the Southern Hemisphere, and it vanishes at the equator.

The f-plane is a plane tangent to the planet's surface at a reference latitude $\varphi_0$, with Cartesian coordinates $x$ pointing east, $y$ pointing north, and $z$ pointing up. On it the Coriolis parameter is replaced by the constant
$$f_0 = 2\Omega\sin\varphi_0.$$

The f-plane usually also includes the traditional approximation, in which only the component of the planet's rotation vector along the local vertical is kept. The horizontal component enters the Coriolis force only where a vertical velocity or a vertical force is involved, and the large-scale motion of a thin atmosphere or ocean is nearly horizontal, so its effect is much weaker than that of the vertical component. Dropping it also aligns the rotation with gravity, which allows the horizontal and vertical structure of the flow to be solved for separately. The non-traditional f-plane keeps the horizontal component as well.

== See also ==
- Coriolis force
