= Resonance (disambiguation) =

Resonance is the tendency of a physical system to oscillate at great amplitude at certain frequencies.

Resonance may also refer to:

== Science ==
- Acoustic resonance, resonance of sound waves
- Electrical resonance, resonance of electrical potential or current
- Electron paramagnetic resonance (EPR), also known as Electron spin resonance (ESR)
- Fano resonance
- Feshbach resonance
- Limbic resonance
- Magnetic resonance
- Mechanical resonance, resonance of physical motion
- Nuclear magnetic resonance (NMR)
- Orbital resonance, in celestial mechanics
- Planetary wave resonance, a mechanism hypothesised to explain extreme weather events
- Resonance (chemistry), the electronic delocalization in molecules often represented via a combination of related Lewis structures
- Resonance fluorescence
- Resonances in scattering from potentials
- Resonance (journal), an Indian journal of education
- Resonance (particle physics), of an isolated particle capable of decay that decays spontaneously
- Shape resonance
- Sympathetic resonance

== Music ==
- Resonance FM, a London-based community radio station run by the London Musicians Collective
- Resonance, the magazine of the London Musicians Collective
- Resonance, the magazine for players of the resonator guitar
- Pierre Bachelet (1944–2005), artist known for the 1973 hit "O.K. Chicago"
- Resonance, composition by Liviu Marinescu
- Resonance, a program presented by the Adelaide Guitar Festival

=== Albums ===
- Resonance (Anathema album), a 2001 compilation album by British rock band Anathema
  - Resonance Vol. 2, 2002
- Resonance (Antigama album), 2007
- Resonance (Joe Pass album), 2000
- Resonance (Jordan Rudess album), 1999
- Resonance (Mad at Gravity album), 2002
- Resonance (Madras String Quartet album), 2000
- Resonance, a two-part studio album by South Korean boy group NCT, under the NCT 2020 project
  - Resonance Pt. 1, 2020
  - Resonance Pt. 2, 2020

=== Songs ===
- "Resonance" (T.M.Revolution song), a 2008 song by T.M.Revolution
- "Resonance" (LuvBug song), a song by LuvBug
- "Resonance", a song from the Jordan Rudess album Resonance
- "Resonance", a song by NCT, under the NCT 2020 project
- "Resonance", a 2014 synthwave song from the HOME album Odyssey

== Other uses ==
- Resonance (game), an adventure game published by Wadjet Eye Games
- "Resonance" (Warehouse 13), a 2009 episode of Warehouse 13
- Resonate (company), an Internet technology company
- Ganying, the Chinese theory of Resonance
- Resonance (sociology), sociological concept describing theoretical opposite to alienation

== See also ==
- Sonorant, a class of sounds in phonetics, sometimes called resonants
