= Coastal upwelling of the South Eastern Arabian Sea =

Typical eastern boundary upwelling system

Coastal upwelling of the South Eastern Arabian Sea (SEAS) is a typical eastern boundary upwelling system (EBUS) similar to the California, Bengulea, Canary Island, and Peru-Chile systems. Unlike those four, the SEAS upwelling system needs to be explored in a much focused manner to clearly understand the chemical and biological responses associated with this coastal process.

The coastal upwelling in the south-eastern Arabian Sea occurs seasonally. It begins in the mid Spring (Mid May) along the southern tip of India and as the season advances it spreads northward. It is not a uniform wind-driven upwelling system, but is driven by various factors. While at Cape Comorin it can be modeled as just wind-driven, as the phenomena rises along the west coast of India, longshore wind stresses play an increasing role, as do atmospheric effects from the Bay of Bengal, such as Kelvin and Rossby waves.
