= Resonator (disambiguation) =

A resonator is a device or system that naturally oscillates at some frequencies.

Resonator may also refer to:

== Electronics ==
- Ceramic resonator
- Dielectric resonator antenna
- Piezoelectric resonator (disambiguation)
- Split-ring resonator
- Thin-film bulk acoustic resonator

== Music ==
- Resonators (band), a British dub reggae band

=== Albums ===
- Resonator (Kathryn Williams album), 2016
- Resonator (Tony Levin album), 2006
- Resonator (Pioneer of Sound), by Gary Numan, 2004
- Resonator, by Tom Rothrock, 2007

=== Instruments ===
- Acoustic resonator
- Resonator dulcimer
- Resonator guitar
- Resonator mandolin
- Resonator ukulele

== Other uses ==
- The Resonator, a horror web-series created by William Butler for Full Moon Features

== See also ==
- Resonance (disambiguation)
- Resonate (disambiguation)
- Resonating valence bond theory
- Vocal resonation
