= Edge wave =

Surface gravity wave fixed by refraction against a rigid boundary, often a shoaling beach

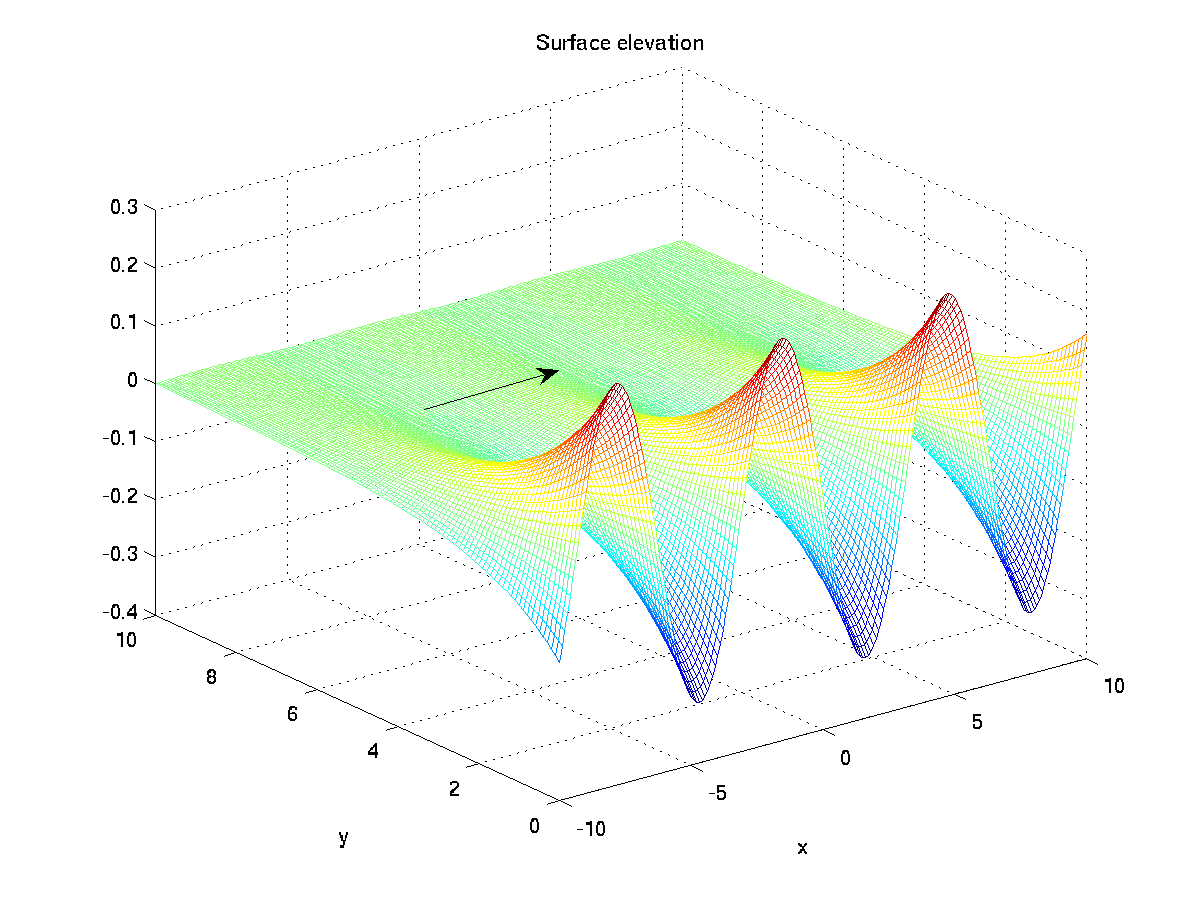
Example of the surface elevation of a progressive edge wave

In fluid dynamics, an edge wave is a surface gravity wave fixed by refraction against a rigid boundary, often a shoaling beach. Progressive edge waves travel along this boundary, varying sinusoidally along it and diminishing exponentially in the offshore direction.

== See also ==
- Coastal Kelvin wave is kept at the boundary by the Coriolis force
