= Potential vorticity =

Simplified approach for understanding fluid motions in a rotating system

In fluid mechanics, potential vorticity (PV) is a quantity which is proportional to the dot product of vorticity and stratification. This quantity, following a parcel of air or water, can only be changed by diabatic or frictional processes. It is a useful concept for understanding the generation of vorticity in cyclogenesis (the formation and development of a cyclone), especially along the polar front, and in analyzing flow in the ocean.

Potential vorticity (PV) is seen as one of the important theoretical successes of modern meteorology. It is a simplified approach for understanding fluid motions in a rotating system such as the Earth's atmosphere and ocean. Its development traces back to the circulation theorem by Bjerknes in 1898, which is a specialized form of Kelvin's circulation theorem. Starting from Hoskins et al., 1985, PV has been more commonly used in operational weather diagnosis such as tracing dynamics of air parcels and inverting for the full flow field. Even after detailed numerical weather forecasts on finer scales were made possible by increases in computational power, the PV view is still used in academia and routine weather forecasts, shedding light on the synoptic scale features for forecasters and researchers.

Baroclinic instability requires the presence of a potential vorticity gradient along which waves amplify during cyclogenesis.

== Bjerknes circulation theorem ==
Vilhelm Bjerknes generalized Helmholtz's vorticity equation (1858) and Kelvin's circulation theorem (1869) to inviscid, geostrophic, and baroclinic fluids, i.e., fluids of varying density in a rotational frame which has a constant angular speed. If we define circulation as the integral of the tangent component of velocity around a closed fluid loop and take the integral of a closed chain of fluid parcels, we obtain

$\frac{DC}{Dt} = - \oint \frac{1}{\rho}\nabla p \cdot \mathrm{d}\mathbf{r} - 2\Omega\frac{DA_e}{Dt},$ (1)

where $\frac{D}{Dt}$ is the time derivative in the rotational frame (not inertial frame), $C$ is the relative circulation, $A_e$ is projection of the area surrounded by the fluid loop on the equatorial plane, $\rho$ is density, $p$ is pressure, and $\Omega$ is the frame's angular speed. With Stokes' theorem, the first term on the right-hand-side can be rewritten as

$\frac{DC}{Dt} = \int_A \frac{\nabla \rho \times \nabla p}{\rho^2} \cdot \mathrm{d}\mathbf{A} - 2\Omega\frac{DA_e}{Dt},$(2)

which states that the rate of the change of the circulation is governed by the variation of density in pressure coordinates and the equatorial projection of its area, corresponding to the first and second terms on the right hand side. The first term is also called the "solenoid term". Under the condition of a barotropic fluid with a constant projection area $A_e$, the Bjerknes circulation theorem reduces to Kelvin's theorem. However, in the context of atmospheric dynamics, such conditions are not a good approximation: if the fluid circuit moves from the equatorial region to the extratropics, $A_e$ is not conserved. Furthermore, the complex geometry of the material circuit approach is not ideal for making an argument about fluid motions.

== Rossby's shallow water PV ==
Carl Rossby proposed in 1939 that, instead of the full three-dimensional vorticity vector, the local vertical component of the absolute vorticity $\zeta_a$ is the most important component for large-scale atmospheric flow, and that the large-scale structure of a two-dimensional non-divergent barotropic flow can be modeled by assuming that $\zeta_a$ is conserved. His later paper in 1940 relaxed this theory from 2D flow to quasi-2D shallow water equations on a beta plane. In this system, the atmosphere is separated into several incompressible layers stacked upon each other, and the vertical velocity can be deduced from integrating the convergence of horizontal flow. For a one-layer shallow water system without external forces or diabatic heating, Rossby showed that

$\frac{D}{Dt}\left(\frac{\zeta + f}{h}\right) = 0$, (3)

where $\zeta$ is the relative vorticity, $h$ is the layer depth, and $f$ is the Coriolis frequency. The conserved quantity, in parentheses in equation (3), was later named the shallow water potential vorticity. For an atmosphere with multiple layers, with each layer having constant potential temperature, the above equation takes the form

$\frac{D}{Dt}\left(\frac{\zeta_\theta + f}{\Delta}\right) = 0,$ (4)

in which $\zeta_\theta$ is the relative vorticity on an isentropic surface—a surface of constant potential temperature, and $\Delta = - \delta p / g$ is a measure of the weight of unit cross-section of an individual air column inside the layer.

=== Interpretation ===
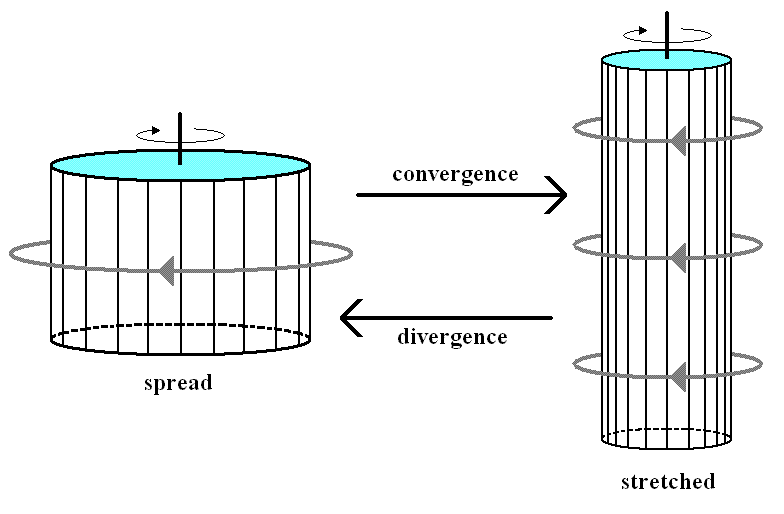
Convergence and divergence of an air parcel

Equation (3) is the atmospheric equivalent to the conservation of angular momentum. For example, a spinning ice skater with her arms spread out laterally can accelerate her rate of spin by contracting her arms. Similarly, when a vortex of air is broadened, it in turn spins more slowly. When the air converges horizontally, the air speed increases to maintain potential vorticity, and the vertical extent increases to conserve mass. On the other hand, divergence causes the vortex to spread, slowing down the rate of spin.

== Ertel's potential vorticity ==
Hans Ertel generalized Rossby's work via an independent paper published in 1942. By identifying a conserved quantity following the motion of an air parcel, it can be proved that a certain quantity called the Ertel potential vorticity is conserved for an idealized continuous fluid. We look at the momentum equation and the mass continuity equation of an idealized compressible fluid in Cartesian coordinates:

$\frac{\partial \mathbf{v}}{\partial t} + \frac{1}{2}\nabla \mathbf{v^2} - \mathbf{v}\times(\nabla\times\mathbf{v}) + 2\mathbf{\Omega} \times \mathbf{v} = -\nabla\Phi - \frac{1}{\rho} \nabla p,$ (5)

$\frac{D \rho}{D t} = - \rho\nabla\cdot\mathbf{v},$ (6)

where $\Phi$ is the geopotential height. Writing the absolute vorticity as $\mathbf{\zeta_a} = \nabla\times\mathbf{v} + 2\mathbf{\Omega}$, $1/\rho$ as $\alpha$, and then taking the curl of the full momentum equation (5), we have

$\frac{\partial}{\partial t}\nabla\times\mathbf{v} - \nabla\times(\mathbf{v}\times\mathbf{\zeta_a}) = \nabla p\times\nabla\alpha.$ (7)

Consider $\psi = \psi(\mathbf{r}, t)$ to be a hydrodynamical invariant, that is, $\frac{D\psi}{Dt}$ equals to zero following the fluid motion in question. Scalar multiplication of equation (7) by $\nabla\psi$, and note that $\frac{\partial}{\partial t}\mathbf{\zeta_a} = \frac{\partial}{\partial t}\nabla\times\mathbf{v}$, we have

$\nabla\psi\cdot\frac{\partial}{\partial t}\mathbf{\zeta_a} - \nabla\psi\cdot[\nabla\times(\mathbf{v}\times\mathbf{\zeta_a})] = \nabla\psi\cdot(\nabla p\times\nabla\alpha).$ (8)

The second term on the left-hand side of equation (8) is equal to $\nabla\cdot[\nabla\psi\times(\mathbf{v}\times\mathbf{\zeta_a})] - (\mathbf{v}\times\zeta_a)\cdot(\nabla\times\nabla\psi)$, in which the second term is zero. From the triple vector product formula, we have

$$\begin{align} \nabla\psi\times(\mathbf{v}\times\mathbf{\zeta_a}) & = \mathbf{v}(\mathbf{\zeta_a}\cdot\nabla\psi) - \mathbf{\zeta_a}(\mathbf{v}\cdot\nabla\psi)\\
& = \mathbf{v}(\mathbf{\zeta_a}\cdot\nabla\psi) + \mathbf{\zeta_a}\frac{\partial\psi}{\partial t},
\end{align}$$
(9)

where the second row is due to the fact that $\psi$ is conserved following the motion, $\frac{D\psi}{Dt} = 0$. Substituting equation (9) into equation (8) above,

$\nabla\psi\cdot\frac{\partial}{\partial t}\mathbf{\zeta_a} + \mathbf{v}\cdot\nabla(\mathbf{\zeta_a}\cdot\nabla\psi) + (\mathbf{\zeta_a}\cdot\nabla\psi)\nabla\cdot\mathbf{v} + \mathbf{\zeta_a}\cdot\frac{\partial}{\partial t}\nabla\psi= \nabla\psi\cdot(\nabla p\times\nabla\alpha).$ (10)

Combining the first, second, and fourth term in equation (10) can yield $\frac{D}{Dt}(\mathbf{\zeta_a}\cdot\nabla\psi)$. Dividing by $\rho$ and using a variant form of mass continuity equation,$\frac{1}{\rho}\nabla\cdot\mathbf{v} = -\frac{1}{\rho^2}\frac{D\rho}{Dt} = \frac{D\alpha}{Dt}$, equation (10) gives

$\alpha\frac{D}{Dt}(\mathbf{\zeta_a}\cdot\nabla\psi) + (\mathbf{\zeta_a}\cdot\nabla\psi)\frac{D\alpha}{Dt} = \alpha \nabla\psi\cdot(\nabla p\times\nabla\alpha)$ (11)

If the invariant $\psi$ is only a function of pressure $p$ and density $\rho$, then its gradient is perpendicular to the cross product of $\nabla p$ and $\nabla \rho$, which means that the right-hand side of equation (11) is equal to zero. Specifically for the atmosphere, potential temperature is chosen as the invariant for frictionless and adiabatic motions. Therefore, the conservation law of Ertel's potential vorticity is given by

$\frac{D}{Dt}PV = 0.$ (12)

the potential vorticity is defined as

$PV = \frac{\mathbf{\zeta_a}\cdot\nabla\theta}{\rho},$ (13)

where $\rho$ is the fluid density, $\mathbf{\zeta_a}$ is the absolute vorticity and $\nabla \theta$ is the gradient of potential temperature. It can be shown through a combination of the first law of thermodynamics and momentum conservation that the potential vorticity can only be changed by diabatic heating (such as latent heat released from condensation) or frictional processes.

If the atmosphere is stably stratified so that the potential temperature $\theta$ increases monotonically with height, $\theta$ can be used as a vertical coordinate instead of $z$. In the $(x, y, \theta)$ coordinate system, "density" is defined as $\sigma\equiv -g^{-1}\partial p/\partial\theta$. Then, if we start the derivation from the horizontal momentum equation in isentropic coordinates, Ertel PV takes a much simpler form

$PV_\theta = \frac{f + \mathbf{k}\cdot(\nabla_\theta\times\mathbf{v})}{\sigma}$ (14)

where $\mathbf{k}$ is the local vertical vector of unit length and $\nabla_\theta$ is the 3-dimensional gradient operator in isentropic coordinates. It can be seen that this form of potential vorticity is just the continuous form of Rossby's isentropic multi-layer PV in equation (4).

=== Interpretation ===
The Ertel PV conservation theorem, equation (12), states that for a dry atmosphere, if an air parcel conserves its potential temperature, its potential vorticity is also conserved following its full three-dimensional motions. In other words, in adiabatic motion, air parcels conserve Ertel PV on an isentropic surface. Remarkably, this quantity can serve as a Lagrangian tracer that links the wind and temperature fields. Using the Ertel PV conservation theorem has led to various advances in understanding the general circulation. One of them was "tropopause folding" process described in Reed et al., (1950). For the upper-troposphere and stratosphere, air parcels follow adiabatic movements during a synoptic period of time. In the extratropical region, isentropic surfaces in the stratosphere can penetrate into the tropopause, and thus air parcels can move between stratosphere and troposphere, although the strong gradient of PV near the tropopause usually prevents this motion. However, in frontal region near jet streaks, which is a concentrated region within a jet stream where the wind speeds are the strongest, the PV contour can extend substantially downward into the troposphere, which is similar to the isentropic surfaces. Therefore, stratospheric air can be advected, following both constant PV and isentropic surfaces, downwards deep into the troposphere. The use of PV maps was also proved to be accurate in distinguishing air parcels of recent stratospheric origin even under sub-synoptic-scale disturbances. (An illustration can be found in Holton, 2004, figure 6.4)

The Ertel PV also acts as a flow tracer in the ocean, and can be used to explain how a range of mountains, such as the Andes, can make the upper westerly winds swerve towards the equator and back. Maps depicting Ertel PV are usually used In meteorological analysis in which the potential vorticity unit (PVU) defined as ${10^{-6} \cdot \mathrm{K} \cdot \mathrm{m}^2 \over \mathrm{kg} \cdot \mathrm{s}} \equiv 1\ \mathrm{PVU}$.

== Quasi-geostrophic PV ==
One of the simplest but nevertheless insightful balancing conditions is in the form of quasi-geostrophic equations. This approximation basically states that for three-dimensional atmospheric motions that are nearly hydrostatic and geostrophic, their geostrophic part can be determined approximately by the pressure field, whereas the ageostrophic part governs the evolution of the geostrophic flow. The potential vorticity in the quasi-geostrophic limit (QGPV) was first formulated by Charney and Stern in 1960. Similar to Chapter 6.3 in Holton 2004, we start from horizontal momentum (15), mass continuity (16), hydrostatic (17), and thermodynamic (18) equations on a beta plane, while assuming that the flow is inviscid and hydrostatic,

$\frac{D_g\mathbf{u_g}}{Dt} + f_0\mathbf{k}\times\mathbf{u_a} + \beta y\mathbf{k}\times\mathbf{u_g}= 0$ (15)

$\nabla_{hp}\cdot\mathbf{u_a} + \frac{\partial\omega}{\partial p} = 0$ (16)

$\frac{\partial\Phi}{\partial p} = - \frac{R\pi}{p}\theta$ (17)

$\frac{D_g\theta}{Dt} + \omega\frac{d\theta_0}{d p} = \frac{J}{c_p\pi}$ (18)

where $\frac{D_g}{Dt} = \frac{\partial}{\partial t} + u_g\frac{\partial}{\partial x} + v_g\frac{\partial}{\partial y}$ represents the geostrophic evolution, $\pi = (p/ps)^{R/c_p}$, $J$ is the diabatic heating term in $Js^{-1}kg^{-1}$, $\Phi$ is the geopotential height, $\mathbf{u_g}$ is the geostrophic component of horizontal velocity, $\mathbf{u_a}$ is the ageostrophic velocity, $\nabla_{hp}$ is horizontal gradient operator in (x, y, p) coordinates. With some manipulation (see Quasi-geostrophic equations or Holton 2004, Chapter 6 for details), one can arrive at a conservation law

$\frac{D_g}{Dt}q = -f_0\frac{\partial}{\partial p}\left(\sigma\frac{\kappa J}{p}\right),$ (19)

where $\sigma = -\frac{R\pi}{p}\frac{d\theta_0}{dp}$ is the spatially averaged dry static stability. Assuming that the flow is adiabatic, which means $J = 0$, we have the conservation of QGPV. The conserved quantity $q$ takes the form

${q = {{{1 \over f_o}{\nabla^2 \Phi}}+{f}+{{\partial \over \partial p}\left({{f_o \over \sigma}{\partial \Phi \over \partial p}}\right)}}},$ (20)

which is the QGPV, and it is also known as the pseudo-potential-vorticity. Apart from the diabatic heating term on the right-hand-side of equation(19), it can also be shown that QGPV can be changed by frictional forces.

The Ertel PV reduces to the QGPV if one expand the Ertel PV to the leading order, and assume that the evolution equation is quasi-geostrophic, i.e., $\frac{D}{Dt}\approx\frac{D_g}{Dt}$. Because of this factor, one should also note that the Ertel PV conserves following air parcel on an isentropic surface and is therefore a good Lagrangian tracer, whereas the QGPV is conserved following large-scale geostrophic flow. QGPV has been widely used in depicting large-scale atmospheric flow structures, as discussed in the section PV invertibility principle;

== PV invertibility principle ==
Apart from being a Lagrangian tracer, the potential vorticity also gives dynamical implications via the invertibility principle. For a 2-dimensional ideal fluid, the vorticity distribution controls the stream function by a Laplace operator,

${\zeta = {{{\nabla^2 \Psi}}}},$ (21)

where $\zeta$ is the relative vorticity, and $\Psi$ is the streamfunction. Hence from the knowledge of vorticity field, the operator can be inverted and the stream function can be calculated. In this particular case (equation 21), vorticity gives all the information needed to deduce motions, or streamfunction, thus one can think in terms of vorticity to understand the dynamics of the fluid. A similar principle was originally introduced for the potential vorticity in three-dimensional fluid in the 1940s by Kleinschmit, and was developed by Charney and Stern in their quasi-geostrophic theory.

Despite theoretical elegance of Ertel's potential vorticity, early applications of Ertel PV are limited to tracer studies using special isentropic maps. It is generally insufficient to deduce other variables from the knowledge of Ertel PV fields only, since it is a product of wind ($\zeta_a$) and temperature fields ($\theta$ and $\rho$). However, large-scale atmospheric motions are inherently quasi-static; wind and mass fields are adjusted and balanced against each other (e.g., gradient balance, geostrophic balance). Therefore, other assumptions can be made to form a closure and deduce the complete structure of the flow in question:

(1) introduce balancing conditions of certain form. These conditions must be physically realizable and stable without instabilities such as static instability. Also, the space and time scales of the motion must be compatible with the assumed balance;

(2) specify a certain reference state, such as distribution of temperature, potential temperature, or geopotential height;

(3) assert proper boundary conditions and invert the PV field globally.

The first and second assumptions are expressed explicitly in the derivation of quasi-geostrophic PV. Leading-order geostrophic balance is used as the balancing condition. The second-order terms such as ageostrophic winds, perturbations of potential temperature and perturbations of geostrophic height should have consistent magnitude, i.e., of the order of Rossby number. The reference state is zonally averaged potential temperature and geopotential height. The third assumption is apparent even for 2-dimensional vorticity inversion because inverting the Laplace operator in equation (21), which is a second-order elliptic operator, requires knowledge of the boundary conditions.

For example, in equation (20), invertibility implies that given the knowledge of $q$, the Laplace-like operator can be inverted to yield geopotential height $\Phi$. $\Phi$ is also proportional to the QG streamfunction $\Psi$ under the quasi-geostrophic assumption. The geostrophic wind field can then be readily deduced from $\Psi$. Lastly, the temperature field $\theta$ is given by substituting $\Phi$ into the hydrostatic equation (17).

== See also ==
- Vorticity
- Circulation (fluid dynamics)
