= Resonate (disambiguation) =

Resonate relates to the phenomenon of resonance.

Resonate may also refer to:

- Resonate, an album by Sonicflood
- Resonate (album), a 2016 album by Glenn Hughes
- Resonate (company), a technology company
- Resonate (festival), an annual festival for art and digital culture in Belgrade, Serbia
- Resonate Broadcasting, an Australian media company
- Resonate Group, a British software, technology and services company
- Resonate Magazine, published by the Australian Music Centre
- Resonate (album series), trance music compilation album series 2002-2021
