= Rossby parameter =

The Rossby parameter (or simply beta $\beta$) is a number used in geophysics and meteorology which arises due to the meridional variation of the Coriolis force caused by the spherical shape of the Earth. It is important in the generation of Rossby waves. The Rossby parameter $\beta$ is given by

$$\beta = \frac{\partial f}{\partial y} = \frac{1}{a} \frac{d}{d\phi}  (2 \omega \sin\phi) = \frac{2\omega \cos\phi}{a}$$

where $f$ is the Coriolis parameter, $\phi$ is the latitude, $\omega$ is the angular speed of the Earth's rotation, and $a$ is the mean radius of the Earth. Although both involve Coriolis effects, the Rossby parameter describes the variation of the effects with latitude (hence the latitudinal derivative), and should not be confused with the Rossby number.

== See also ==
- Beta plane
