= Resonance (Madras String Quartet album) =

Resonance is an album by the Madras String Quartet led by violinist V. S. Narasimhan. The album consists of several compositions in Carnatic Music that are played against a background of harmonies from Western Classical Music. This album is the result of an effort to fuse Western Classical Music and Indian Classical Music. The songs are played entirely on a violin with cellos and violas providing the background.

Some Carnatic Musicians have criticized the Quartet saying that they are "Innovative but Discordant". The album, however has received significant praise from many music enthusiasts all over India.

The album comprises nine songs:

== Track listing ==
S. No.	Song	Ragam	Thaalam	Composer
1	Varnam	Ragamalika	Adi	Patnam Subramania Iyer
2	Palukavademira	Devamanohari	Adi	Mysore Vasudevachar
3	Esane	Chakravakam	Rupakam	Papanasam Sivan
4	Raghuvamsa	Kathanakuthoohalam	Adi	Patnam Subramania Iyer
5	Amba Kamakshi	Bhairavi	Misra Chapu	Shyama Sastri
6	Mokshamu	Saramati	Adi	Thyagaraja
7	Sara sara samarai	Kunthalavarali	Adi	Thyagaraja
8	Mohanalahari	Bilahari	Adi	V.S.Narasimhan
9	Krishna Ni Begane Baaro	Yamunakalyani	Misra Chapu	Vyasatirtha
