= Solenoid (meteorology) =

In the context of meteorology, a solenoid is a tube-shaped region in the atmosphere where isobaric (constant pressure) and isopycnal (constant density) surfaces intersect, causing vertical circulation. They are so-named because they are driven by the solenoid term of the vorticity equation. Examples of solenoids include the sea breeze circulation and the mountain–plains solenoid.
