= Rossby radius of deformation =

Concept in atmospheric dynamics and physical oceanography

In atmospheric dynamics and physical oceanography, the Rossby radius of deformation is the length scale at which rotational effects become as important as buoyancy or gravity wave effects in the evolution of the flow about some disturbance.

For a barotropic ocean, the Rossby radius is $L_R \equiv \frac{(gD)^{1/2}}{f}$, where $g$ is the gravitational acceleration, $D$ is the water depth, and $\,f$ is the Coriolis parameter.

For f = 1×10^{−4} s^{−1} appropriate to 45° latitude, g = 9.81 m/s^{2} and D = 4 km, L_{R} ≈ 2000 km; using the same latitude and gravity but changing D to 40 m; L_{R} ≈ 200 km.

The nth baroclinic Rossby radius is:

$L_{R, n} \equiv \frac{NH}{n \pi f_0}$, where $N$ is the Brunt–Väisälä frequency, $H$ is the scale height, and n = 1, 2, ... .

In Earth's atmosphere, the ratio N/f_{0} is typically of order 100, so the Rossby radius is about 100 times the vertical scale height, H. For a vertical scale associated with the height of the tropopause, L_{R,1} ≈ 1000 km, which is the predominant scale seen on weather charts for cyclones and anticyclones. This is commonly called the synoptic scale.

In the ocean, the baroclinic Rossby radius varies dramatically with latitude. Near the equator it is larger than 200 km, while in the high latitude regions it is less than 10 km. The size of ocean eddies varies similarly; in low latitude regions, near the equator, eddies are much larger than in high latitude regions.

The associated dimensionless parameter is the Rossby number. Both are named in honor of Carl-Gustav Rossby.

How well a numerical model resolves the Rossby radius affects the optimal arrangement of its variables on its grid. Of the Arakawa grids, the C-grid simulates geostrophic adjustment best unless the Rossby radius is approximately the grid spacing or smaller. The C-grid has therefore often been used in atmospheric models, where the Rossby radius of the deepest modes is of order 1000 km. In ocean models, where the Rossby radius is of order 10 km and historically could not be resolved, the B-grid has seen more use.
