= Resonate (company) =

- Company type: Privately held companies
- Industry: Computer software
- Founded: 2008
- Headquarters: Reston, Virginia, United States
- Key people: Bryan Gernert, CEO and Co-founder; Andreas Hunn, COO and Co-founder; Sara Taylor Fagan, Co-founder; John Brady, Co-founder
- Services: Online advertising

Resonate is a technology company which claims to have pioneered a model for combining big data and psychographic survey studies to develop a sophisticated understanding of consumer motivations, values, attitudes and beliefs. Products such as Resonate Analytics offer an understanding of consumer personal values and enable brand marketers and political advocacy groups to determine “why” people take action.

Founded in 2008 and headquartered in Reston, VA with offices in Chicago, Los Angeles, New York, and Washington, D.C., Resonate is privately held, having raised nearly $30M in funding from firms including Greycroft Partners, iNovia Capital and Revolution Growth.

== History ==
Resonate was founded by Bryan Gernert, Andreas Hunn, Sara Taylor Fagan and John Brady in 2008 in Alexandria, Virginia with the goal to reach people according to their personal values, level of activism and brand market motivations beyond political party affiliation or basic demographics.

In early 2009, Resonate raised US $2 million from angel investors. Series A funding was raised in 2010 for the amount of US $5 million from Greycroft Partners and iNovia Capital. Additional funding was raised in 2012 as a Series B investment of US $22 million from Revolution Growth, Greycroft Partners and iNovia Capital.

== Methodology ==
Resonate's product methodology uses combined datasets of interview data collected via survey and related web behavior data to train predictive models using an ensemble of advanced machine learning techniques. Once models are "trained" the process is applied to the full behavioral data stream, processing tens of millions of cookies per night, and assigning values and attributes to each according to the most updated observations. Processing includes examining up to 80,000 distinct behaviors to predict each of the 13,000 attributes in the Resonate platform.
