= Rossby wave =

Inertial wave in rotating fluids

Meanders of the Northern Hemisphere's jet stream developing around the northern polar vortex (a, b) and finally detaching a "drop" of cold air (c). Orange: warmer masses of air; pink: jet stream; blue: colder masses of air.

Rossby waves, also known as planetary waves, are a type of inertial wave naturally occurring in rotating fluids. They were first identified by Sweden-born American meteorologist Carl-Gustaf Arvid Rossby in the Earth's atmosphere in 1939. They are observed in the atmospheres and oceans of Earth and other planets, owing to the rotation of Earth or of the planet involved. Atmospheric Rossby waves on Earth are giant meanders in high-altitude winds that have a major influence on weather. These waves are associated with pressure systems and the jet stream (especially around the polar vortices). Oceanic Rossby waves move along the thermocline: the boundary between the warm upper layer and the cold deeper part of the ocean.

== Rossby wave types ==
=== Atmospheric waves ===
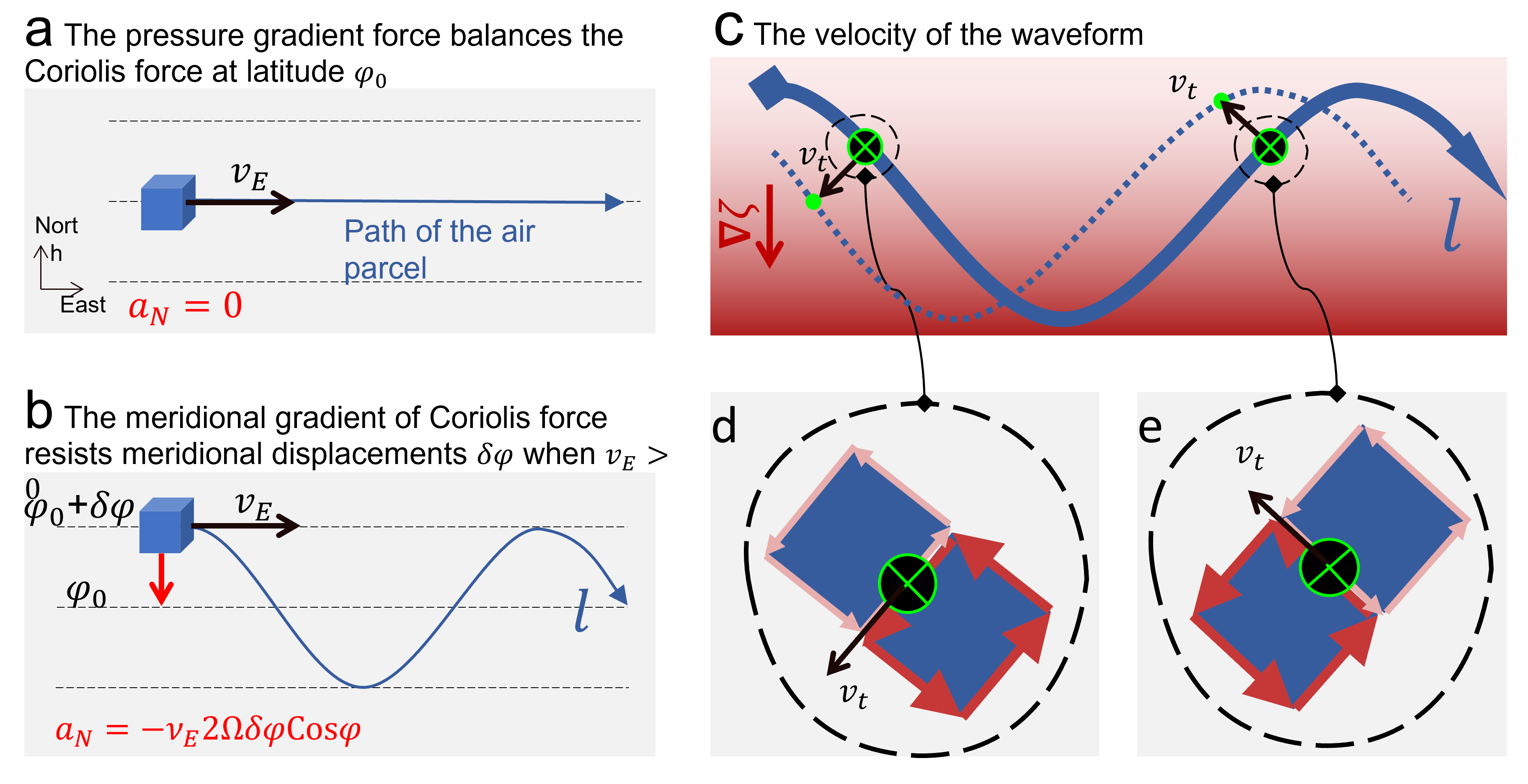
Sketches of Rossby waves' fundamental principles. a and b The restoring force. c–e The waveform's velocity. In a, an air parcel follows along latitude $\varphi_0$ at an eastward velocity $v_E$ with a meridional acceleration $a_N=0$ when the pressure gradient force balances the Coriolis force. In b, when the parcel encounters a small displacement $\delta\varphi$ in latitude, the Coriolis force's gradient imposes a meridional acceleration $a_N$ that always points against $\delta\varphi$ when $v_E>0$. Here, $\Omega$ denotes the Earth's angular frequency and $a_N$ is the northward Coriolis acceleration. While the parcel meanders along the blue arrowed line $l$ in b , its waveform travels westward as sketched in c. The absolute vorticity composes the planetary vorticity $f$ and the relative vorticity $\zeta$, reflecting the Earth's rotation and the parcel's rotation with respect to the Earth, respectively. The conservation of absolute vorticity $\eta$ determines a southward gradient of $\zeta$, as denoted by the red shadow in c. The gradient's projection along the flow path $l$ is typically not zero and would cause a tangential velocity $v_t$. As an example, the path $l$ in c is zoomed in at two green crosses, displayed in d and e. These two crosses are associated with positive and negative gradients of $\zeta$ along $l$, respectively, as denoted by the red and pink arrows in d and e. The black arrows $v_t$ denote the vector sums of the red and pink arrows bordering the crosses, both of which project zonally westward. The parcels at these crosses drift toward the green points in c and, visually, the path $l$ drifts westward toward the dotted line.

Atmospheric Rossby waves result from the conservation of potential vorticity and are influenced by the Coriolis force and pressure gradient. The image on the left sketches fundamental principles of the wave, e.g., its restoring force and westward phase velocity. The rotation causes fluids to turn to the right as they move in the northern hemisphere and to the left in the southern hemisphere. For example, a fluid that moves from the equator toward the north pole will deviate toward the east; a fluid moving toward the equator from the north will deviate toward the west. These deviations are caused by the Coriolis force and conservation of potential vorticity which leads to changes of relative vorticity. This is analogous to conservation of angular momentum in mechanics. In planetary atmospheres, including Earth, Rossby waves are due to the variation in the Coriolis effect with latitude.

One can identify a terrestrial Rossby wave as its phase velocity, marked by its wave crest, always has a westward component. However, the collected set of Rossby waves may appear to move in either direction with what is known as its group velocity. In general, shorter waves have an eastward group velocity and long waves a westward group velocity.

The terms "barotropic" and "baroclinic" are used to distinguish the vertical structure of Rossby waves. Barotropic Rossby waves do not vary in the vertical, and have the fastest propagation speeds. The baroclinic wave modes, on the other hand, do vary in the vertical. They are also slower, with speeds of only a few centimeters per second or less.

Most investigations of Rossby waves have been done on those in Earth's atmosphere. Rossby waves in the Earth's atmosphere are easy to observe as (usually 4–6) large-scale meanders of the jet stream. When these deviations become very pronounced, masses of cold or warm air detach, and become low-strength cyclones and anticyclones, respectively, and are responsible for day-to-day weather patterns at mid-latitudes. The action of Rossby waves partially explains why eastern continental edges in the Northern Hemisphere, such as the Northeast United States and Eastern Canada, are colder than Western Europe at the same latitudes, and why the Mediterranean is dry during summer (Rodwell–Hoskins mechanism).

==== Poleward-propagating atmospheric waves ====
Deep convection (heat transfer) to the troposphere is enhanced over very warm sea surfaces in the tropics, such as during El Niño events. This tropical forcing generates atmospheric Rossby waves that have a poleward and eastward migration.

Poleward-propagating Rossby waves explain many of the observed statistical connections between low- and high-latitude climates. One such phenomenon is sudden stratospheric warming. Poleward-propagating Rossby waves are an important and unambiguous part of the variability in the Northern Hemisphere, as expressed in the Pacific North America pattern. Similar mechanisms apply in the Southern Hemisphere and partly explain the strong variability in the Amundsen Sea region of Antarctica. In 2011, a Nature Geoscience study using general circulation models linked Pacific Rossby waves generated by increasing central tropical Pacific temperatures to warming of the Amundsen Sea region, leading to winter and spring continental warming of Ellsworth Land and Marie Byrd Land in West Antarctica via an increase in advection.

==== Rossby waves on other planets ====
Atmospheric Rossby waves, like Kelvin waves, can occur on any rotating planet with an atmosphere. The Y-shaped cloud feature on Venus is attributed to Kelvin and Rossby waves. It has likewise been hypothesized that Rossby waves cause the hexagonal cloud formation at Saturn's north pole.

=== Oceanic waves ===
Oceanic Rossby waves are large-scale waves within an ocean basin. They have a low amplitude, in the order of centimetres (at the surface) to metres (at the thermocline), compared with atmospheric Rossby waves which are in the order of hundreds of kilometres. They may take months to cross an ocean basin. They gain momentum from wind stress at the ocean surface layer and are thought to communicate climatic changes due to variability in forcing, due to both the wind and buoyancy. Off-equatorial Rossby waves are believed to propagate through eastward-propagating Kelvin waves that upwell against Eastern Boundary Currents, while equatorial Kelvin waves are believed to derive some of their energy from the reflection of Rossby waves against Western Boundary Currents.

Both barotropic and baroclinic waves cause variations of the sea surface height, although the length of the waves made them difficult to detect until the advent of satellite altimetry. Satellite observations have confirmed the existence of oceanic Rossby waves.

Baroclinic waves also generate significant displacements of the oceanic thermocline, often of tens of meters. Satellite observations have revealed the stately progression of Rossby waves across all the ocean basins, particularly at low- and mid-latitudes. Away from the equator, the Rossby radius of deformation generally decreases toward the poles. At a given latitude, linear theory predicts that the westward speed of long baroclinic Rossby waves is proportional to the square of this radius. In a basin like the Pacific, waves travelling at the equator may take months, while closer to the poles transit may take decades.

Rossby waves have been suggested as an important mechanism to account for the heating of the ocean on Europa, a moon of Jupiter.

=== Waves in astrophysical discs ===
Rossby wave instabilities are also thought to be found in astrophysical discs, for example, around newly forming stars.

== Amplification ==
It has been proposed that a number of regional weather extremes in the Northern Hemisphere associated with blocked atmospheric circulation patterns may have been caused by quasiresonant amplification of Rossby waves. Examples include the 2013 European floods, the 2012 China floods, the 2010 Russian heat wave, the 2010 Pakistan floods and the 2003 European heat wave. Even taking global warming into account, the 2003 heat wave would have been highly unlikely without such a mechanism.

Normally freely travelling synoptic-scale Rossby waves and quasistationary planetary-scale Rossby waves exist in the mid-latitudes with only weak interactions. The hypothesis, proposed by Vladimir Petoukhov, Stefan Rahmstorf, Stefan Petri, and Hans Joachim Schellnhuber, is that under some circumstances these waves interact to produce the static pattern. For this to happen, they suggest, the zonal (east-west) wave number of both types of wave should be in the range 6–8, the synoptic waves should be arrested within the troposphere (so that energy does not escape to the stratosphere) and mid-latitude waveguides should trap the quasistationary components of the synoptic waves. In this case the planetary-scale waves may respond unusually strongly to orography and thermal sources and sinks because of "quasiresonance".

A 2017 study by Mann, Rahmstorf, et al. connected the phenomenon of anthropogenic Arctic amplification to planetary wave resonance and extreme weather events.

== Mathematical definitions ==
=== Free barotropic Rossby waves under a zonal flow with linearized vorticity equation ===
To start with, a zonal mean flow, U, can be considered to be perturbed where U is constant in time and space. Let $\vec{u} = \langle u, v\rangle$ be the total horizontal wind field, where u and v are the components of the wind in the x- and y- directions, respectively. The total wind field can be written as a mean flow, U, with a small superimposed perturbation, u′ and v′.
$$u = U + u'(t,x,y)\!$$
$$v = v'(t,x,y)\!$$

The perturbation is assumed to be much smaller than the mean zonal flow.
$$U \gg u',v'\!$$

The relative vorticity $\eta$ and the perturbations $u'$ and $v'$ can be written in terms of the stream function $\psi$ (assuming non-divergent flow, for which the stream function completely describes the flow):
$$\begin{align}
u' & =  \frac{\partial \psi}{\partial y} \\[5pt]
v' & =  -\frac{\partial \psi}{\partial x} \\[5pt]
\eta & = \nabla \times (u' \mathbf{\hat{\boldsymbol{\imath}}}  + v' \mathbf{\hat{\boldsymbol{\jmath}}}) = -\nabla^2 \psi
\end{align}$$

Considering a parcel of air that has no relative vorticity before perturbation (uniform U has no vorticity) but with planetary vorticity f as a function of the latitude, perturbation will lead to a slight change of latitude, so the perturbed relative vorticity must change in order to conserve potential vorticity. Also the above approximation U >> u' ensures that the perturbation flow does not advect relative vorticity.

$$\frac{d (\eta + f) }{dt} = 0 = \frac{\partial \eta}{\partial t} + U \frac{\partial \eta}{\partial x} + \beta v'$$
with $\beta = \frac{\partial f}{\partial y}$. Plug in the definition of stream function to obtain:
$$0 = \frac{\partial \nabla^2 \psi}{\partial t} + U \frac{\partial \nabla^2 \psi}{\partial x} + \beta \frac{\partial \psi}{\partial x}$$

Using the method of undetermined coefficients one can consider a traveling wave solution with zonal and meridional wavenumbers k and ℓ, respectively, and frequency $\omega$:
$$\psi = \psi_0 e^{i(kx+\ell y-\omega t)}\!$$

This yields the dispersion relation:
$$\omega = Uk - \beta \frac k {k^2+\ell^2}$$

The zonal (x-direction) phase speed and group velocity of the Rossby wave are then given by
$$\begin{align}
c & \equiv \frac \omega k = U - \frac \beta {k^2+\ell^2}, \\[5pt]
c_g & \equiv \frac{\partial \omega}{\partial k}\ = U - \frac{\beta (\ell^2-k^2)}{(k^2+\ell^2)^2},
\end{align}$$
where c is the phase speed, c_{g} is the group speed, U is the mean westerly flow, $\beta$ is the Rossby parameter, k is the zonal wavenumber, and ℓ is the meridional wavenumber. It is noted that the zonal phase speed of Rossby waves is always westward (traveling east to west) relative to mean flow U, but the zonal group speed of Rossby waves can be eastward or westward depending on wavenumber.

=== Rossby parameter ===
The Rossby parameter is defined as the rate of change of the Coriolis frequency along the meridional direction:
$$\beta = \frac{\partial f}{\partial y} = \frac 1 a \frac d {d\varphi}  (2 \omega \sin\varphi) = \frac{2\omega \cos\varphi} a,$$
where $\varphi$ is the latitude, ω is the angular speed of the Earth's rotation, and a is the mean radius of the Earth.

If $\beta = 0$, there will be no Rossby waves; Rossby waves owe their origin to the gradient of the tangential speed of the planetary rotation (planetary vorticity). A "cylinder" planet has no Rossby waves. It also means that at the equator of any rotating, sphere-like planet, including Earth, one will still have Rossby waves, despite the fact that $f = 0$, because $\beta > 0$. These are known as Equatorial Rossby waves.

== See also ==
- Atmospheric wave
- Equatorial wave
- Equatorial Rossby wave – mathematical treatment
- Harmonic
- Kelvin wave
- Polar vortex
- Rossby whistle
- Sudden stratospheric warming

== Bibliography ==
- Rossby, C.-G. (21 June 1939). "Relation between variations in the intensity of the zonal circulation of the atmosphere and the displacements of the semi-permanent centers of action". Journal of Marine Research. 2 (1): 38–55. doi:10.1357/002224039806649023. S2CID 27148455.
- Platzman, G. W. (July 1968). "The Rossby wave". Quarterly Journal of the Royal Meteorological Society. 94 (401): 225–248. Bibcode:1968QJRMS..94..225P. doi:10.1002/qj.49709440102.
- Dickinson, R. E. (January 1978). "Rossby Waves—Long-Period Oscillations of Oceans and Atmospheres". Annual Review of Fluid Mechanics. 10 (1): 159–195. Bibcode:1978AnRFM..10..159D. doi:10.1146/annurev.fl.10.010178.001111.
