= Rossby number =

Ratio of inertial force to Coriolis force

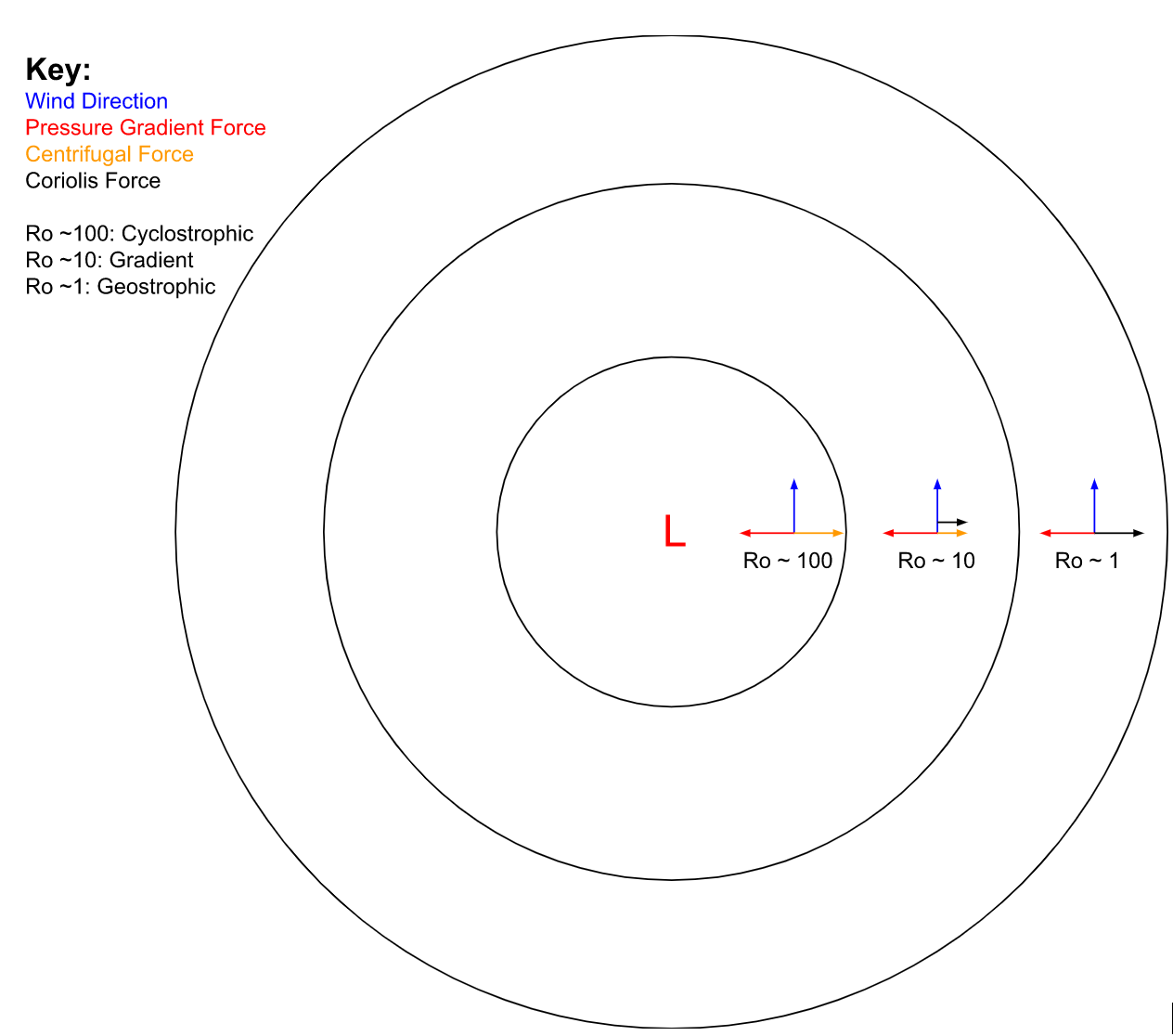
Value of the Rossby Number and associated balanced flows around a low pressure storm.

The Rossby number (Ro), named for Carl-Gustav Arvid Rossby, is a dimensionless number used in describing fluid flow. The Rossby number is the ratio of inertial force to Coriolis force, terms $|\mathbf{v} \cdot \nabla \mathbf{v}| \sim U^2 / L$ and $\Omega \times \mathbf{v} \sim U\Omega$ in the Navier–Stokes equations respectively. It is commonly used in geophysical phenomena in the oceans and atmosphere, where it characterizes the importance of Coriolis accelerations arising from planetary rotation. It is also known as the Kibel number.

== Definition and theory ==
The Rossby number (Ro, not R_{o}) is defined as

$$\text{Ro} = \frac{U}{Lf},$$

where U and L are respectively characteristic velocity and length scales of the phenomenon, and $f = 2\Omega \sin \phi$ is the Coriolis frequency, with $\Omega$ being the angular frequency of planetary rotation, and $\phi$ the latitude.

A small Rossby number signifies a system strongly affected by Coriolis forces, and a large Rossby number signifies a system in which inertial and centrifugal forces dominate. For example, in tornadoes, the Rossby number is large (≈ 10^{3}), in low-pressure systems it is low (≈ 0.1–1), and in oceanic systems it is of the order of unity, but depending on the phenomena can range over several orders of magnitude (≈ 10^{−2}–10^{2}). As a result, in tornadoes the Coriolis force is negligible, and balance is between pressure and centrifugal forces (called cyclostrophic balance). Cyclostrophic balance also commonly occurs in the inner core of a tropical cyclone. In low-pressure systems, centrifugal force is negligible, and balance is between Coriolis and pressure forces (called geostrophic balance). In the oceans all three forces are comparable (called cyclogeostrophic balance). For a figure showing spatial and temporal scales of motions in the atmosphere and oceans, see Kantha and Clayson.

When the Rossby number is large (either because f is small, such as in the tropics and at lower latitudes; or because L is small, that is, for small-scale motions such as flow in a bathtub; or for large speeds), the effects of planetary rotation are unimportant and can be neglected. When the Rossby number is small, then the effects of planetary rotation are large, and the net acceleration is comparably small, allowing the use of the geostrophic approximation.

== See also ==
- Coriolis force – Apparent force in a rotating reference frame
- Centrifugal force – Type of inertial force
