= Beta plane =

Approximation whereby the Coriolis parameter, f, is set to vary linearly in space

In geophysical fluid dynamics, an approximation whereby the Coriolis parameter, f, is set to vary linearly in space is called a beta plane approximation.

On a rotating sphere such as the Earth, f varies with the sine of latitude; in the so-called f-plane approximation, this variation is ignored, and a value of f appropriate for a particular latitude is used throughout the domain. This approximation can be visualized as a tangent plane touching the surface of the sphere at this latitude.

A more accurate model is a linear Taylor series approximation to this variability about a given latitude $\phi_0$:

$f = f_0 + \beta y$, where $f_0$ is the Coriolis parameter at $\phi_0$, $\beta = (\mathrm{d}f/\mathrm{d}y)|_{\phi_0} = 2\Omega\cos(\phi_0)/a$ is the Rossby parameter, $y$ is the meridional distance from $\phi_0$, $\Omega$ is the angular rotation rate of the Earth, and $a$ is the Earth's radius.

In analogy with the f-plane, this approximation is termed the beta plane, even though it no longer describes dynamics on a hypothetical tangent plane. The advantage of the beta plane approximation over more accurate formulations is that it does not contribute nonlinear terms to the dynamical equations; such terms make the equations harder to solve. The name 'beta plane' derives from the convention to denote the linear coefficient of variation with the Greek letter β.

The beta plane approximation is useful for the theoretical analysis of many phenomena in geophysical fluid dynamics since it makes the equations much more tractable, yet retains the important information that the Coriolis parameter varies in space. In particular, Rossby waves, the most important type of waves if one considers large-scale atmospheric and oceanic dynamics, depend on the variation of f as a restoring force; they do not occur if the Coriolis parameter is approximated only as a constant.

== See also ==
- Rossby parameter
- Coriolis effect
- Coriolis frequency
- Baroclinic instability
- Quasi-geostrophic equations
