= Q-Vectors =

Q-vectors are used in atmospheric dynamics to understand physical processes such as vertical motion and frontogenesis. Q-vectors are not physical quantities that can be measured in the atmosphere but are derived from the quasi-geostrophic equations and can be used in the previous diagnostic situations. On meteorological charts, Q-vectors point toward upward motion and away from downward motion. Q-vectors are an alternative to the omega equation for diagnosing vertical motion in the quasi-geostrophic equations.

== Derivation ==
First derived in 1978, Q-vector derivation can be simplified for the midlatitudes, using the midlatitude β-plane quasi-geostrophic prediction equations:

1. $\frac{D_g u_g}{Dt} - f_{0}v_a - \beta y v_g = 0$ (x component of quasi-geostrophic momentum equation)
2. $\frac{D_g v_g}{Dt} + f_{0}u_a + \beta y u_g = 0$ (y component of quasi-geostrophic momentum equation)
3. $\frac{D_g T}{Dt} - \frac{\sigma p}{R} \omega = \frac{J}{c_p}$ (quasi-geostrophic thermodynamic equation)

And the thermal wind equations:

$f_{0} \frac{\partial u_g}{\partial p} = \frac{R}{p} \frac{\partial T}{\partial y}$ (x component of thermal wind equation)

$f_{0} \frac{\partial v_g}{\partial p} = - \frac{R}{p} \frac{\partial T}{\partial x}$ (y component of thermal wind equation)

where $f_0$ is the Coriolis parameter, approximated by the constant 1e^{−4} s^{−1}; $R$ is the atmospheric ideal gas constant; $\beta$ is the latitudinal change in the Coriolis parameter $\beta = \frac{\partial f} {\partial y}$; $\sigma$ is a static stability parameter; $c_p$ is the specific heat at constant pressure; $p$ is pressure; $T$ is temperature; anything with a subscript $g$ indicates geostrophic; anything with a subscript $a$ indicates ageostrophic; $J$ is a diabatic heating rate; and $\omega$ is the Lagrangian rate change of pressure with time. $\omega = \frac{Dp}{Dt}$. Note that because pressure decreases with height in the atmosphere, a negative value of $\omega$ is upward vertical motion, analogous to $+w=\frac{Dz}{Dt}$.

From these equations we can get expressions for the Q-vector:

$Q_i = - \frac{R}{\sigma p} \left[ \frac{\partial u_g}{\partial x} \frac{\partial T}{\partial x} + \frac{\partial v_g}{\partial x} \frac{\partial T}{\partial y} \right]$

$Q_j = - \frac{R}{\sigma p} \left[ \frac{\partial u_g}{\partial y} \frac{\partial T}{\partial x} + \frac{\partial v_g}{\partial y} \frac{\partial T}{\partial y} \right]$

And in vector form:

$Q_i = - \frac{R}{\sigma p} \frac{\partial \vec{V_g}}{\partial x} \cdot \vec{\nabla} T$

$Q_j = - \frac{R}{\sigma p} \frac{\partial \vec{V_g}}{\partial y} \cdot \vec{\nabla} T$

Plugging these Q-vector equations into the quasi-geostrophic omega equation gives:

$\left(\sigma \overrightarrow{\nabla^2} + f_{\circ}^2 \frac{\partial ^2}{\partial p^2} \right) \omega = -2 \vec{\nabla} \cdot \vec{Q} + f_{\circ} \beta \frac{\partial v_g}{\partial p} - \frac{\kappa}{p} \overrightarrow{\nabla^2} J$

If second derivatives are approximated as a negative sign, as is true for a sinusoidal function, the above in an adiabatic setting may be viewed as a statement about upward motion:

$-\omega \propto -2 \vec{\nabla} \cdot \vec{Q}$

Expanding the left-hand side of the quasi-geostrophic omega equation in a Fourier Series gives the $-\omega$ above, implying that a $-\omega$ relationship with the right-hand side of the quasi-geostrophic omega equation can be assumed.

This expression shows that the divergence of the Q-vector ($\vec{\nabla} \cdot \vec{Q}$) is associated with downward motion. Therefore, convergent $\vec{Q}$ forces ascent and divergent $\vec{Q}$ forces descend. Q-vectors and all ageostrophic flow exist to preserve thermal wind balance. Therefore, low level Q-vectors tend to point in the direction of low-level ageostrophic winds.

== Applications ==
Q-vectors can be determined wholly with: geopotential height ($\Phi$) and temperature on a constant pressure surface. Q-vectors always point in the direction of ascending air. For an idealized cyclone and anticyclone in the Northern Hemisphere (where $\frac{\partial T} {\partial y} <0$), cyclones have Q-vectors which point parallel to the thermal wind and anticyclones have Q-vectors that point antiparallel to the thermal wind. This means upward motion in the area of warm air advection and downward motion in the area of cold air advection.

In frontogenesis, temperature gradients need to tighten for initiation. For those situations Q-vectors point toward ascending air and the tightening thermal gradients. In areas of convergent Q-vectors, cyclonic vorticity is created, and in divergent areas, anticyclonic vorticity is created.
