= Omega equation =

Estimate of vertical velocity in meteorology

The omega equation is a culminating result in synoptic-scale meteorology. It is an elliptic partial differential equation, named because its left-hand side produces an estimate of vertical velocity, customarily expressed by symbol $\omega$, in a pressure coordinate measuring height of the atmosphere. Mathematically, $\omega = \frac{dp}{dt}$, where ${d \over dt}$ represents a material derivative. The underlying concept is more general, however, and can also be applied to the Boussinesq fluid equation system where vertical velocity is $w = \frac{dz}{dt}$ in altitude coordinate z.

== Concept and summary ==
Vertical wind is crucial to weather and storms of all types. Even slow, broad updrafts can create convective instability or bring air to its lifted condensation level creating stratiform cloud decks. Unfortunately, predicting vertical motion directly is difficult. For synoptic scales in Earth's broad and shallow troposphere, the vertical component of Newton's law of motion is sacrificed in meteorology's primitive equations, by accepting the hydrostatic approximation. Instead, vertical velocity must be solved through its link to horizontal laws of motion, via the mass continuity equation. But this presents further difficulties, because horizontal winds are mostly geostrophic, to a good approximation. Geostrophic winds merely circulate horizontally, and do not significantly converge or diverge in the horizontal to provide the needed link to mass continuity and thus vertical motion.

The key insight embodied by the quasi-geostrophic omega equation is that thermal wind balance (the combination of hydrostatic and geostrophic force balances above) holds throughout time, even though the horizontal transport of momentum and heat by geostrophic winds will often tend to destroy that balance. Logically, then, a small non-geostrophic component of the wind (one which is divergent, and thus connected to vertical motion) must be acting as a secondary circulation to maintain balance of the geostrophic primary circulation. The quasi-geostrophic omega $\omega_{QG}$ is the hypothetical vertical motion whose adiabatic cooling or warming effect (based on the atmosphere's static stability) would prevent thermal wind imbalance from growing with time, by countering the balance-destroying (or imbalance-creating) effects of advection. Strictly speaking, QG theory approximates both the advected momentum and the advecting velocity as given by the geostrophic wind.

In summary, one may consider the vertical velocity that results from solving the omega equation as that which would be needed to maintain geostrophy and hydrostasy in the face of advection by the geostrophic wind.

The equation reads:

$$\sigma\nabla^2_\text{H}\omega + f^2\frac{\partial^2\omega}{\partial p^2} = f \frac{\partial}{\partial p} \left[\mathbf{V}_\text{g} \cdot \nabla_\text{H} \left(\zeta_\text{g} + f\right)\right] - \nabla^2_\text{H} \left(\mathbf{V}_\text{g}\cdot\nabla_\text{H} \frac{\partial\phi}{\partial p}\right)$$	1

where $f$ is the Coriolis parameter, $\sigma$ is related to the static stability, $\mathbf{V}_\text{g}$ is the geostrophic velocity vector, $\zeta_\text{g}$ is the geostrophic relative vorticity, $\phi$ is the geopotential, $\nabla^2_\text{H}$ is the horizontal Laplacian operator and $\nabla_\text{H}$ is the horizontal del operator. Its sign and sense in typical weather applications is: upward motion is produced by positive vorticity advection above the level in question (the first term), plus warm advection (the second term).

== Derivation ==
The derivation of the $\omega$ equation is based on the vertical component of the vorticity equation, and the thermodynamic equation. The vertical vorticity equation for a frictionless atmosphere may be written using pressure as the vertical coordinate:

$$\frac{\partial \xi}{\partial t} + V \cdot \nabla\eta - f \frac{\partial \omega}{\partial p} = \left( \xi \frac{\partial \omega}{\partial p} - \omega \frac{\partial \xi}{\partial p} \right) + \hat k \cdot \nabla\omega \times \frac{\partial V}{\partial p}$$	2

Here $\xi$ is the relative vorticity, $V$ the horizontal wind velocity vector, whose components in the $x$ and $y$ directions are $u$ and $v$ respectively, $\eta$ the absolute vorticity $\xi + f$, $f$ is the Coriolis parameter, $\omega = \frac{dp}{dt}$ the material derivative of pressure $p$, $\hat k$ is the unit vertical vector, $\nabla$ is the isobaric Del (grad) operator, $\left( \xi \frac{\partial \omega}{\partial p} - \omega \frac{\partial \xi}{\partial p} \right)$ is the vertical advection of vorticity and $\hat k \cdot \nabla\omega \times \frac{\partial V}{\partial p}$ represents the "tilting" term or transformation of horizontal vorticity into vertical vorticity.

The thermodynamic equation may be written as:

$$\frac{\partial}{\partial t} \left( - \frac{\partial Z}{\partial p} \right) + V \cdot \nabla \left( - \frac{\partial Z}{\partial p} \right) - k \omega = \frac{R}{C_\text{p} \cdot g} \cdot \frac{Q}{p}$$	3

where $k \equiv \left( \frac{\partial Z}{\partial p}\right) \frac{\partial}{\partial p} \ln\theta$, in which $Q$ is the heating rate (supply of energy per unit time and unit mass), $C_\text{p}$ is the specific heat of dry air, $R$ is the gas constant for dry air, $\theta$ is the potential temperature and $\phi$ is geopotential $(gZ)$.

The $\omega$ equation (1) is obtained from equation (2) and (3) by casting both equations in terms of geopotential Z, and eliminating time derivatives based on the physical assumption that thermal wind imbalance remains small across time, or d/dt(imbalance) = 0. For the first step, the relative vorticity must be approximated as the geostrophic vorticity:
$$\xi = \frac{g}{f}\nabla^2 Z$$

Expanding the final "tilting" term in (2) into Cartesian coordinates (although we will soon neglect it), the vorticity equation reads:

$$\frac{\partial}{\partial t}\left(\frac{g}{f}\nabla^2 Z \right) + V \cdot \nabla\eta - f \frac{\partial \omega}{\partial p} = \left(\xi \frac{\partial \omega}{\partial p } - \omega \frac{\partial \xi}{\partial p} \right) + \left(\frac{\partial \omega}{\partial y}\frac{\partial u}{\partial p}- \frac{\partial \omega}{\partial x}\frac{\partial v}{\partial p}\right)$$	4

Differentiating (4) with respect to $p$ gives:

$$\frac{g}{f}\frac{\partial}{\partial t} \nabla^2 \left(\frac{\partial Z}{\partial p} \right) + \frac{\partial}{\partial p} (V \cdot \nabla\eta) - f \frac{\partial^2 \omega}{\partial p^2}  = \frac{\partial}{\partial p}\left(\xi \frac{\partial \omega}{\partial p } - \omega \frac{\partial \xi}{\partial p} \right) + \frac{\partial}{\partial p} \left(\frac{\partial \omega}{\partial y} \cdot \frac{\partial u}{\partial p} - \frac{\partial \omega}{\partial x}\cdot \frac{\partial v}{\partial p}\right)$$	5

Taking the Laplacian ($\nabla^2$) of (3) gives:

$$\frac{\partial}{\partial t}\nabla^2 \left(-\frac{\partial Z}{\partial p} \right) + \nabla^2 [V \cdot \nabla \left(-\frac{\partial Z}{\partial p} \right)] - \nabla^2 k \omega = \frac{R}{C_\text{p} \cdot g} \cdot \frac{\nabla^2 Q}{p}$$	6

Adding (5) to g/f times (6), substituting $gk = \sigma$, and approximating horizontal advection with geostrophic advection (using the Jacobian formalism) gives:

$$\nabla^2\omega + \frac{f^2}{\sigma} \frac{\partial^2\omega}{\partial p^2} = \frac{1}{\sigma} \left[ \frac{\partial}{\partial p} J(\phi,\eta) + \frac{1}{f}\nabla^2 J \left(\phi, -\frac{\partial \phi}{\partial p} \right) \right] - \frac{f}{\sigma} \frac{\partial}{\partial p} \left( \frac{\partial \omega}{\partial y} \cdot \frac{\partial u}{\partial p} - \frac{\partial \omega}{\partial x} \cdot \frac{\partial v}{\partial p} \right) - \frac{f}{\sigma} \frac{\partial}{\partial p} \left( \xi \frac{\partial \omega}{\partial p} - \omega \frac{\partial \xi}{\partial p} \right) \frac{R \cdot \nabla^2 Q}{C_\text{p} \cdot S \cdot p}$$	7

Equation (7) is now a diagnostic, linear differential equation for $\omega$, which can be split into two terms, namely $\omega_1$ and $\omega_2$, such that:

$$\nabla^2\omega_1 + \frac{f^2}{\sigma} \frac{\partial^2\omega_1}{\partial p^2} =\frac{1}{\sigma} \left[ \frac{\partial}{\partial p} J(\phi,\eta) + \frac{1}{f}\nabla^2 J \left(\phi, -\frac{\partial \phi}{\partial p} \right) \right] - \frac{f}{\sigma} \frac{\partial}{\partial p} \left( \frac{\partial \omega}{\partial y} \cdot \frac{\partial u}{\partial p} - \frac{\partial \omega}{\partial x} \cdot \frac{\partial v}{\partial p} \right) - \frac{f}{\sigma} \frac{\partial}{\partial p} \left( \xi \frac{\partial \omega}{\partial p} - \omega \frac{\partial \xi}{\partial p} \right)$$	8

and

$$\nabla^2\omega_2 + \frac{f^2}{\sigma} \frac{\partial^2\omega_2}{\partial p^2} = \frac{R \cdot \nabla^2 Q}{C_\text{p} \cdot \sigma \cdot p}$$	9

where $\omega_1$ is the vertical velocity attributable to all the flow-dependent advective tendencies in Equation (8), and $\omega_2$ is the vertical velocity due to the non-adiabatic heating, which includes the latent heat of condensation, sensible heat fluxes, radiative heating, etc. Since all advecting velocities in the horizontal have been replaced with geostrophic values, and geostrophic winds are nearly nondivergent, neglect of vertical advection terms is a consistent further assumption of the quasi-geostrophic set, leaving only the square bracketed term in Eqs. (7-8) to enter (1).

== Interpretation ==
Equation (1) for adiabatic $\omega_{QG}$ is used by meteorologists and operational weather forecasters to anticipate where upward motion will occur on synoptic charts. For sinusoidal or wavelike motions, where Laplacian operators act simply as a negative sign, and the equation's meaning can be expressed with words indicating the sign of the effect: Upward motion is driven by positive vorticity advection increasing with height (or PVA for short), plus warm air advection (or WAA for short). The opposite signed case is logically opposite, for this linear equation.

In a location where the imbalancing effects of adiabatic advection are acting to drive upward motion (where $\omega_{QG} < 0$ in Eq. 1), the inertia of the geostrophic wind field (that is, its propensity to carry on forward) is creating a demand for decreasing thickness $\frac{-\partial Z}{\partial p}$ in order for thermal wind balance to continue to hold. For instance, when there is an approaching upper-level cyclone or trough above the level in question, the part of $\omega_{QG}$ attributable to the first term in Eq. 1 is upward motion needed to create the increasingly cool air column that is required hypsometrically under the falling heights. That adiabatic reasoning must be supplemented by an appreciation of feedbacks from flow-dependent heating, such as latent heat release. If latent heat is released as air cools, then an additional upward motion will be required based on Eq. (9) to counteract its effect, in order to still create the necessary cool core. Another way to think about such a feedback is to consider an effective static stability that is smaller in saturated air than in unsaturated air, although a complication of that view is that latent heating mediated by convection need not be vertically local to the altitude where cooling by $\omega_{QG}$ triggers its formation. For this reason, retaining a separate Q term like Equation (9) is a useful approach.
