= Frontogenesis =

Meteorological process of producing weather fronts

A visual demonstration of how frontogenesis is displayed on surface weather analysis maps, for both warm fronts and cold fronts

Frontogenesis is a meteorological process of tightening of horizontal temperature gradients to produce fronts. In the end, two types of fronts form: cold fronts and warm fronts. A cold front is a narrow line where temperature decreases rapidly. A warm front is a narrow line of warmer temperatures and essentially where much of the precipitation occurs. Frontogenesis occurs as a result of a developing baroclinic wave. According to Hoskins & Bretherton (1972, p. 11), there are eight mechanisms that influence temperature gradients: horizontal deformation, horizontal shearing, vertical deformation, differential vertical motion, latent heat release, surface friction, turbulence and mixing, and radiation. Semigeostrophic frontogenesis theory focuses on the role of horizontal deformation and shear.

== Kinematics ==
Horizontal deformation in mid-latitude cyclones concentrates temperature gradients—cold air from the poles and warm air from the equator.

Horizontal shear has two effects on an air parcel; it tends to rotate the parcel (think of placing a wheel at a point in space and as the wind blows, the wheel rotates) and deform the parcel through stretching and shrinking. In the end, this can also tighten temperature gradient, but most importantly, this rotates a concentrated temperature gradient for example, from the x-axis to the y direction.

Within a mid-latitude cyclone, these two key features play an essential role in frontogenesis. On a typical mid-latitude cyclone, there are

- At west side, northerly winds (N/H) or southerly winds (S/H) (associated with cold air) and
- east of the cyclone, southerly winds (N/H) or northerly winds (S/H) (associated with warm air); resulting in horizontal shear deformation.

In the end, this results to concentrate a cyclonic shear along a line of maximum shear (which in this case is the birth of a cold front).

On the eastern side of a cyclone, horizontal deformation is seen which turns into confluence (a result of translation + deformation).

Horizontal deformation at low levels is an important mechanism for the development of both cold and warm fronts (Holton, 2004).

== Elements of frontogenesis ==
The horizontal shear and horizontal deformation direct to concentrate the polar equatorial temperature gradient over a large synoptic scale (1000 km).

The quasi-geostrophic equations fail in the dynamics of frontogenesis because this weather society is of smaller scale compared to the Rossby radius; so semigeostrophic theory is used.

Generally, Rossby number—ratio of inertial to coriolis force

is used to formulate a condition of geostrophic flow.

- Across the front, the Rossby number is on the order of udu/dx/fv = (10 m/s)^2/(1000 km)/(1e-4 s-1)/(1 m/s) = 1; this shows we cannot ignore the inertial term (one must take into account the ageostrophic wind).
- Along the front, the Rossby number is on the order of udv/dx/fu = (10 m/s)/(1000 km)*(1e-4 s-1)*(10 m/s) = 0.01, which means it is in geostrophic and thermal wind balance.

Finally, looking at a cross section (y-z) through the confluent flow, using Q-vectors (Q pointing toward upward motion), on the warm side (bottom of confluent schematic), there is upward motion and on the other hand, the cold side (top of confluent schematic), there is downward motion.

The cross-section points out convergence (arrows pointing towards each other) associated with tightening of horizontal temperature gradient.

Conversely, divergence is noticed (arrows point away from each other), associated with stretching horizontal temperature gradient. Since the strength of the ageostrophic flow is proportional to temperature gradient, the ageostrophic tightening tendencies grow rapidly after the initial geostrophic intensification.

== Development of the frontogenetical circulation ==
During frontogenesis, the temperature gradient tightens and as a result, the thermal wind becomes imbalanced. To maintain balance, the geostrophic wind aloft and below adjust, such that regions of divergence/convergence form. Mass continuity would require a vertical transport of air along the cold front where there is divergence (lowered pressure). Although this circulation is described by a series of processes, they are actually occurring at the same time, observable along the front as a thermally direct circulation. There are several factors that influence the final shape and tilt of the circulation around the front, ultimately determining the type and location of clouds and precipitation.

== 3-Dimensional equation ==
The three-dimensional form of the frontogenesis equation is

$$\begin{alignat}{3} F = \frac{1}{|\nabla \theta|}\cdot \frac{\partial \theta}{\partial x}\left \{ \frac{1}{C_p} \left ( \frac{p_\circ}{p} \right )^\kappa \left [ \frac{\partial}{\partial x} \left (\frac{dQ}{dt} \right ) \right ] - \left ( \frac{\partial u}{\partial x} \frac{\partial \theta}{\partial x} \right ) - \left ( \frac{\partial v}{\partial x} \frac{\partial \theta}{\partial y} \right ) - \left ( \frac{\partial w}{\partial x} \frac{\partial \theta}{\partial z} \right ) \right \} \\
+ \frac{\partial \theta}{\partial y}\left \{ \frac{1}{C_p} \left ( \frac{p_\circ}{p} \right )^\kappa \left [ \frac{\partial}{\partial y} \left (\frac{dQ}{dt} \right ) \right ] - \left ( \frac{\partial u}{\partial y} \frac{\partial \theta}{\partial x} \right ) - \left ( \frac{\partial v}{\partial y} \frac{\partial \theta}{\partial y} \right ) - \left ( \frac{\partial w}{\partial y} \frac{\partial \theta}{\partial z} \right ) \right \} \\
+ \frac{\partial \theta}{\partial z}\left \{ \frac{p_\circ^\kappa}{C_p} \left [ \frac{\partial}{\partial z} \left (p^{-\kappa} \frac{dQ}{dt} \right ) \right ] - \left ( \frac{\partial u}{\partial z} \frac{\partial \theta}{\partial x} \right ) - \left ( \frac{\partial v}{\partial z} \frac{\partial \theta}{\partial y} \right ) - \left ( \frac{\partial w}{\partial z} \frac{\partial \theta}{\partial z} \right ) \right \}\end{alignat}$$

where each dimension begins with a diabatic term; in the $x$ direction

$\frac{1}{C_p} \left ( \frac{p_\circ}{p} \right )^\kappa \left [ \frac{\partial}{\partial x} \left (\frac{dQ}{dt} \right ) \right ]$

in the $y$ direction

$\frac{1}{C_p} \left ( \frac{p_\circ}{p} \right )^\kappa \left [ \frac{\partial}{\partial y} \left (\frac{dQ}{dt} \right ) \right ]$

and in the $z$ direction

$\frac{p_\circ^\kappa}{C_p} \left [ \frac{\partial}{\partial z} \left (p^{-\kappa} \frac{dQ}{dt} \right ) \right ]$.

The equation also includes horizontal and vertical deformation terms; in the $x$ direction

$-\left ( \frac{\partial u}{\partial x} \frac{\partial \theta}{\partial x} \right ) - \left ( \frac{\partial v}{\partial x} \frac{\partial \theta}{\partial y} \right )$

and in the $y$ direction

$-\left ( \frac{\partial u}{\partial y} \frac{\partial \theta}{\partial x} \right ) - \left ( \frac{\partial v}{\partial y} \frac{\partial \theta}{\partial y} \right )$

and in the vertical $z$ direction

$-\left ( \frac{\partial u}{\partial z} \frac{\partial \theta}{\partial x} \right ) - \left ( \frac{\partial v}{\partial z} \frac{\partial \theta}{\partial y} \right )$.

The final terms are the tilting term and the vertical divergence term; the tilting term is represented in the three-dimensional frontogenesis equation in the $x$ and $y$ directions

$-\left ( \frac{\partial w}{\partial x} \frac{\partial \theta}{\partial z} \right )$

$-\left ( \frac{\partial w}{\partial y} \frac{\partial \theta}{\partial z} \right )$

and the vertical divergence term is present as

$-\left ( \frac{\partial w}{\partial z} \frac{\partial \theta}{\partial z} \right )$

== See also ==
- Frontolysis
