= Station model =

Type of meteorological illustration

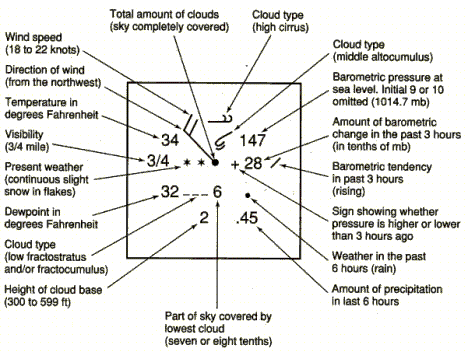
Station model as used in the United States plotted on surface weather analyses

In meteorology, station models are symbolic illustrations showing the weather occurring at a given reporting station. Meteorologists created the station model to fit a number of weather elements into a small space on weather maps. This allows map users to analyze patterns in atmospheric pressure, temperature, wind speed and direction, cloud cover, precipitation, and other parameters. The most common station plots depict surface weather observations although upper air plots at various mandatory levels are also frequently depicted.

Station model plots use an internationally accepted coding convention that has changed little since August 1, 1941. Elements in the plot show the key weather elements, including temperature, dew point, wind, cloud cover, air pressure, pressure tendency, and precipitation.

== Measurement location and units ==
Weather maps primarily use the station model to show surface weather conditions, but the model can also show the weather aloft as reported by a weather balloon's radiosonde or a pilot's report.

== Plotted winds ==
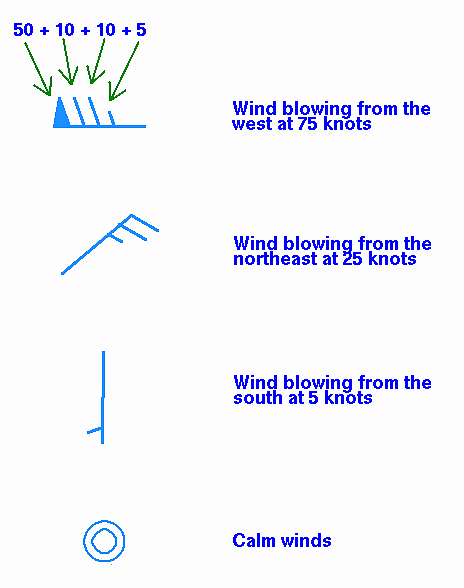

The station model uses a wind barb to show both wind direction and speed. The wind barb shows the speed using "flags" on the end.

- Each half of a flag depicts 5 kn (9.3 km/h; 5.8 mph)
- Each full flag depicts 10 kn (19 km/h; 12 mph)
- Each pennant (filled triangle) depicts 50 kn (93 km/h; 58 mph)

Winds are depicted as blowing from the direction the flags are facing. Therefore, a northeast wind will be depicted with a line extending from the cloud circle to the northeast, with flags indicating wind speed on the northeast end of this line. Once plotted on a map, an analysis of isotachs (lines of equal wind speeds) can be accomplished. Isotachs are particularly useful in diagnosing the location of the jet stream on upper level constant pressure charts, usually at or above the 300 hPa level.

The flags and pennants point to the low pressure, so it is possible to determine at which hemisphere the station is standing. The barbs in the figure at the right are located at the Northern Hemisphere, because the wind is circling counter clock-wise around a low-pressure area at the Northern Hemisphere (the wind is blowing in the opposite direction at the Southern Hemisphere, see also Buys Ballot's law).

More than a century ago, winds were initially plotted as arrows facing downwind, with feathers on both sides of the staff to indicate wind speed. In the United States, the change to the modern convention of flags shown on one side of the staff to indicate wind speed took effect on August 1, 1941.

== Cloud cover ==

Along with wind direction, cloud cover is one of the oldest atmospheric conditions to be coded on a station model. The circle in the middle of the station model represents cloud cover. In the United Kingdom, when the observation is taken from an automated weather observation site, the shape is a triangle. If the shape is completely filled in, it is overcast. If conditions are completely clear, the circle or triangle is empty. If conditions are partly cloudy, the circle or triangle is partially filled in. The cloud cover shape has different looks depending upon how many oktas (eighths of the sky) are covered by cloud. A sky half full of clouds would have a circle that was half white and half black. Below the shape indicating sky cover, the station model can indicate the coverage of low clouds, in oktas, and the ceiling height in hundreds of feet. The ceiling height is the height at which more than half the sky is covered by clouds.

For pilots, knowledge of the sky cover helps determine if visual flight rules (VFR) are being met. Knowing the degree of cloud cover can help determine whether or not various weather fronts, such as cold fronts or warm fronts, have passed by a location. A nephanalysis, contouring areas that are cloudy with scalloped lines, can be performed to indicate a system's cloud and precipitation pattern. This technique is rarely performed nowadays, due to the prevalence of satellite imagery worldwide.

== Cloud types ==
Cloud classification by altitude of occurrence (towering vertical cumulus congestus not shown)

Above or below the circle for manned stations (automatic stations do not report cloud types) that indicates sky cover can lie one or more symbols indicating cloud types in any of the low, middle, and high-étages for tropospheric clouds. One predominant cloud type may be depicted for each of three étages, if known. The middle and high-étage types are depicted above the sky cover circle of the station model, while the main low-étage cloud type is indicated below the circle. Since the station model has limited room, it makes no special provision for vertical or multi-level clouds that can occupy more than one étage at a particular time. Consequently, cloud genera with significant vertical development may be coded and plotted as low or middle depending on the altitude at which they normally form. Cumulus and cumulonimbus usually form in the low étage of the troposphere and achieve vertical extent by growing upward into the middle or high étage. Conversely, nimbostratus usually forms in the middle étage of the troposphere and becomes vertically developed by growing downward into the low étage. Although the SYNOP code has no separate formal group classification for vertical or multi-level clouds, the observer procedure for selecting numerical codes is designed to give high reporting priority to those genera or species that show significant vertical development.

The symbols used for clouds emulate the cloud shape. Cirrus is indicated by a couple hooks, cumulus are indicated by a mound shape, with cumulonimbus indicated with an upside down trapezoid on top of the cumulus symbol to indicate its anvil. When there is more than one cloud type present per level, the cloud type with the highest priority is included. Knowing the cloud type at various locations can help determine whether or not a weather front has passed by a particular location. A low deck of stratus could indicate a station is still north of a warm front, while thunderstorms can indicate the approach of a squall line or cold front.

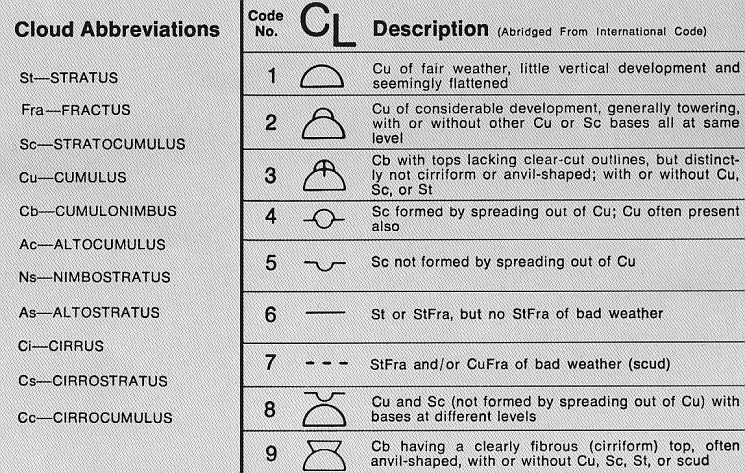
Low étage (Sc,St) and upward-growing vertical (Cu, Cb)

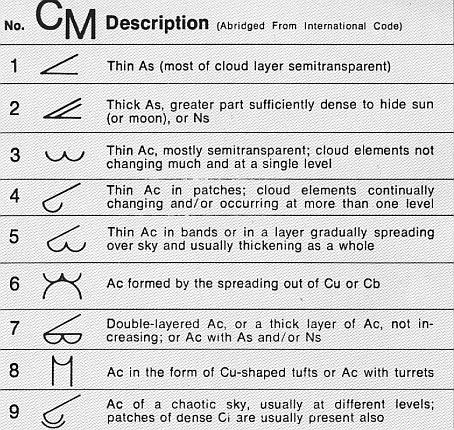
Middle étage (Ac,As) and downward-growing vertical (Ns)

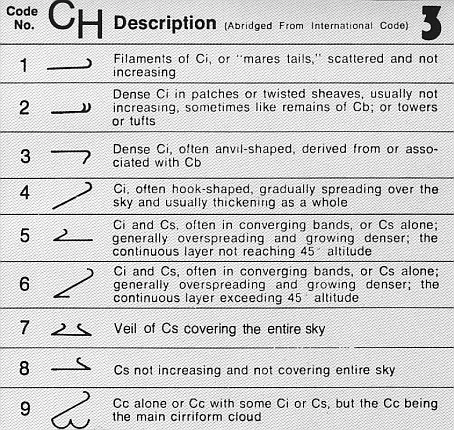
High étage (Ci,Cc,Cs)

== Present weather and visibility ==
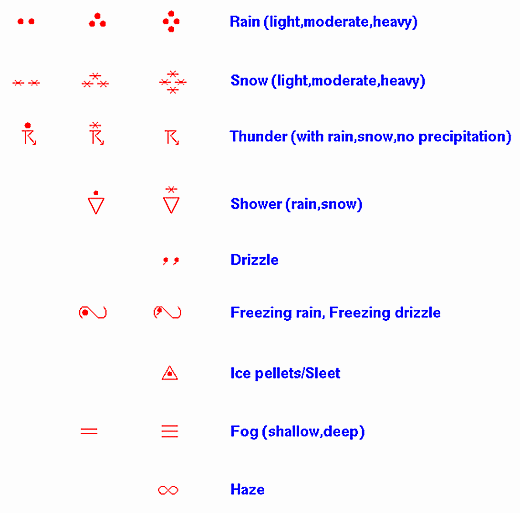
Common present weather symbols

To the left of the cloud shape in the center of the station model is the symbol depicting present weather. The present weather symbol depicts the current weather which normally is obstructing the visibility at the time of observation. The visibility itself is shown as a number, in statute miles in the United States and meters elsewhere, describing how far the observer can see at that time. This number is located to the left of the present weather symbol. For pilots, knowledge of the horizontal visibility helps determine if they are flying through instrument meteorological conditions (IMC), such as foggy or smoky conditions, as well as areas of intense precipitation. Present weather depicted with the station model can include:

- Dust
- Fog
- Haze
- Ocean spray
- Precipitation
- Sand
- Smoke
- Thunderstorms
- Volcanic ash

== Temperature and dew point ==
To left of center in the station model, the temperature and dew point are plotted. Within the United States on surface weather maps, they are still plotted in degrees Fahrenheit. Otherwise, they will be in units of degrees Celsius. This knowledge is important to meteorologists because when this data is plotted on a map, isotherms and isodrosotherms (lines of equal dew point) are easily analyzed, either by man or machine, which can help determine location of weather fronts.

== Sea level pressure and height of pressure surface ==
On the top right corner of the model for a surface weather map is the pressure, showing the last two integer digits of the pressure in millibars, or hectopascals, along with the first decimal. For instance, if the pressure at a certain location is 999.7 hPa, the pressure portion of the station model will read 997. Although the first digit or two of the pressure is left off, other nearby stations give away whether the pressure starts with a 10 or a 9. Most of the time, choosing first digits that would lead to a value nearest to 1000 works out best. The plotting of this value within the station model allows for the analysis of isobars on weather maps. Within maps which plot data on constant pressure surfaces, the pressure is replaced with the height of the pressure surface.

== Pressure tendency ==
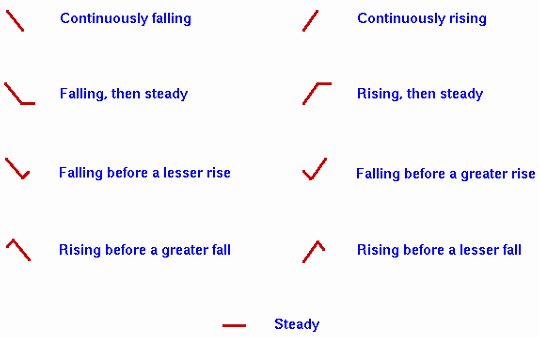
Pressure tendency figures

Below the pressure will lie the pressure tendency figure, which indicates the pressure change over the past three hours. The number depicting the pressure change will usually have two digits and indicate the pressure change in 0.1 millibar increments. There are nine different figures which represent the pressure change. A slant angled up and right indicates a steady rise, while a downward slant to the lower right indicates a steady fall. Steady rises can indicate improving conditions and approaching high pressure, and normally occur in the wake of a cold front. Steady falls can indicate deteriorating conditions and an approaching low pressure area, with the largest falls occurring in advance of a surface cyclone and its attendant warm front.

The time of the day must be considered, as there are two natural rises per day (locally around 10 am and 10 pm) and two natural falls per day (locally around 4 am and 4 pm). These daily changes in pressure can mask the movement of pressure systems and fronts past a location. The lowest natural dip in the pressure, in a stagnant weather pattern, occurs around 4 pm while the highest natural peak in pressure occurs around 10 am. Once plotted on a map, the analysis of isallobars (lines of equal pressure change) can be plotted on a map, which can indicate the direction of motion of high and low pressures systems across the map domain.

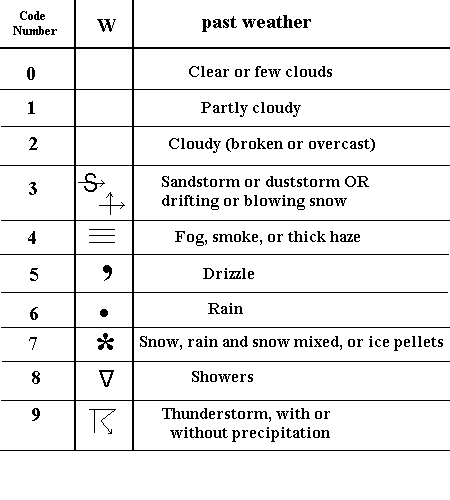
Past weather symbols

== Past weather ==
Station models can have past weather plotted within them, which would be located just under the pressure tendency. They indicate the type of weather experienced during the past six hours. The weather types are limited to obstructions of visibility and precipitation.

Animations may depict a time series of station model conditions which is most often used to show recent changes in weather conditions and are useful in nowcasting and forecasting.

== See also ==
- Surface weather analysis
- Mesonet
- METAR
