= Kelvin wave (disambiguation) =

Kelvin wave may refer to:

- Coastal and equatorial Kelvin waves, the waves in rotating shallow water that are trapped against a boundary, from the Kelvin's 1879 paper
- Kelvin waves on vortex filaments, helical bending modes of a vortex line, from Kelvin's 1880 work on vortex vibrations
- Kelvin wake ship-wave pattern, the V-shaped pattern behind a moving hull
- Shearing waves, also called Kelvin modes, disturbances tilted by a background shear flow, as in the shearing sheet approximation

== See also ==
- Kelvin–Helmholtz waves, shear-instability waves at an interface, term "Kelvin waves" is sometimes used loosely for them in the cloud observation literature
- Kelvin modes in rotating-fluid inertial waves
