= Quasi-geostrophic equations =

Atmospheric and ocean flow equations

While geostrophic motion refers to the wind that would result from an exact balance between the Coriolis force and horizontal pressure-gradient forces, quasi-geostrophic (QG) motion refers to flows where the Coriolis force and pressure gradient forces are almost in balance, but with inertia also having an effect.

== Origin ==
Atmospheric and oceanographic flows take place over horizontal length scales which are very large compared to their vertical length scale, and so they can be described using the shallow water equations. The Rossby number is a dimensionless number which characterises the strength of inertia compared to the strength of the Coriolis force. The quasi-geostrophic equations are approximations to the shallow water equations in the limit of small Rossby number, so that inertial forces are an order of magnitude smaller than the Coriolis and pressure forces. If the Rossby number is equal to zero then we recover geostrophic flow.

The quasi-geostrophic equations were first formulated by Jule Charney.

== Derivation of the single-layer QG equations ==
In Cartesian coordinates, the components of the geostrophic wind are

${f_0} {v_g} = {\partial \Phi \over \partial x}$ (1a)
${f_0} {u_g} = - {\partial \Phi \over \partial y}$ (1b)

where ${\Phi}$ is the geopotential.

The geostrophic vorticity

$${\zeta_g} = {\hat{\mathbf{k}} \cdot \nabla \times \mathbf{V_g}}$$

can therefore be expressed in terms of the geopotential as

${\zeta_g} = {{\partial v_g \over \partial x} - {\partial u_g \over \partial y} = {1 \over f_0} \left({ {\partial^2 \Phi \over \partial x^2} + {\partial^2 \Phi \over \partial y^2}}\right) = {1 \over f_0}{\nabla^2 \Phi}}$ (2)

Equation (2) can be used to find ${\zeta_g (x,y)}$ from a known field ${\Phi (x,y)}$. Alternatively, it can also be used to determine ${\Phi}$ from a known distribution of ${\zeta_g}$ by inverting the Laplacian operator.

The quasi-geostrophic vorticity equation can be obtained from the ${x}$ and ${y}$ components of the quasi-geostrophic momentum equation which can then be derived from the horizontal momentum equation

${D\mathbf{V} \over Dt} + f \hat{\mathbf{k}} \times \mathbf{V} = - \nabla \Phi$ (3)

The material derivative in (3) is defined by

${{D \over Dt} = {\left({\partial \over \partial t}\right)_p} + {\left({\mathbf{V} \cdot \nabla}\right)_p} + {\omega {\partial \over \partial p}}}$ (4)
where ${\omega = {Dp \over Dt}}$ is the pressure change following the motion.

The horizontal velocity ${\mathbf{V}}$ can be separated into a geostrophic ${\mathbf{V_g}}$ and an ageostrophic ${\mathbf{V_a}}$ part

${\mathbf{V} = \mathbf{V_g} + \mathbf{V_a}}$ (5)

Two important assumptions of the quasi-geostrophic approximation are

1. ${\mathbf{V_g} \gg \mathbf{V_a} }$, or, more precisely ${{|\mathbf{V_a}| \over |\mathbf{V_g}|}} \sim O(\text{Rossby number})$.
2. the beta-plane approximation ${f = f_0 + \beta y}$ with ${\frac{\beta y}{f_0} \sim O(\text{Rossby number})}$

The second assumption justifies letting the Coriolis parameter have a constant value ${f_0}$ in the geostrophic approximation and approximating its variation in the Coriolis force term by ${f_0 + \beta y}$. However, because the acceleration following the motion, which is given in (1) as the difference between the Coriolis force and the pressure gradient force, depends on the departure of the actual wind from the geostrophic wind, it is not permissible to simply replace the velocity by its geostrophic velocity in the Coriolis term. The acceleration in (3) can then be rewritten as

${f \hat{\mathbf{k}} \times \mathbf{V} + \nabla \Phi} = {(f_0 + \beta y)\hat{\mathbf{k}} \times (\mathbf{V_g} + \mathbf{V_a}) - f_0 \hat{\mathbf{k}} \times \mathbf{V_g}} = {f_0 \hat{\mathbf{k}} \times \mathbf{V_a} + \beta y \hat{\mathbf{k}} \times \mathbf{V_g} }$ (6)

The approximate horizontal momentum equation thus has the form

${D_g \mathbf{V_g} \over Dt} = {-f_0 \hat{\mathbf{k}} \times \mathbf{V_a} - \beta y \hat{\mathbf{k}} \times \mathbf{V_g}}$ (7)

Expressing equation (7) in terms of its components,

${{D_g u_g \over Dt} - {f_0 v_a} - {\beta y v_g} = 0}$ (8a)

${{D_g v_g \over Dt} + {f_0 u_a} + {\beta y u_g} = 0}$ (8b)

Taking ${{\partial (8b) \over \partial x} - {\partial (8a) \over \partial y}}$, and noting that geostrophic wind is nondivergent (i.e., ${\nabla \cdot \mathbf{V} = 0}$), the vorticity equation is

${{D_g \zeta_g \over Dt} = - f_0 \left ({{\partial u_a \over \partial x}+{\partial v_a \over \partial y}} \right) - \beta v_g }$ (9)

Because ${f}$ depends only on ${y}$ (i.e., ${{D_g f \over Dt} = \mathbf{V_g} \cdot \nabla f = \beta v_g}$) and that the divergence of the ageostrophic wind can be written in terms of ${\omega}$ based on the continuity equation

$${{\partial u_a \over \partial x}+{\partial v_a \over \partial y}+{\partial \omega \over \partial p}=0}$$

equation (9) can therefore be written as

${{\partial \zeta_g \over \partial t} = {-\mathbf{V_g} \cdot \nabla ({\zeta_g + f})} + {f_0 {\partial \omega \over \partial p}} }$ (10)

=== The same identity using the geopotential ===
Defining the geopotential tendency ${\chi = {\partial \Phi \over \partial t}}$ and noting that partial differentiation may be reversed, equation (10) can be rewritten in terms of ${\chi}$ as

${{1 \over f_0}{\nabla^2 \chi} = {-\mathbf{V_g} \cdot \nabla \left({{1 \over f_0}{\nabla^2 \Phi} + f} \right)} + {f_0 {\partial \omega \over \partial p}}}$ (11)

The right-hand side of equation (11) depends on variables ${\Phi}$ and ${\omega}$. An analogous equation dependent on these two variables can be derived from the thermodynamic energy equation

${{{ \left ({{\partial \over \partial t} + {\mathbf{V_g} \cdot \nabla}} \right) \left({-\partial \Phi \over \partial p} \right)}-\sigma \omega}={kJ \over p}}$ (12)

where ${\sigma = {-R T_0 \over p}{d \log \Theta_0 \over dp}}$ and ${\Theta_0}$ is the potential temperature corresponding to the basic state temperature. In the midtroposphere, ${\sigma}$ ≈ ${2.5 \times 10^{-6} \mathrm{m}{^2}\mathrm{Pa}^{-2}\mathrm{s}^{-2}}$.

Multiplying (12) by ${f_0 \over \sigma}$ and differentiating with respect to ${p}$ and using the definition of ${\chi}$ yields

${{{\partial \over \partial p} \left ({{f_0 \over \sigma}{\partial \chi \over \partial p}} \right )}=-{{\partial \over \partial p}\left({{f_0 \over \sigma}{\mathbf{V_g} \cdot \nabla}{\partial \Phi \over \partial p}}\right)}-{{f_0}{\partial \omega \over \partial p}}-{{f_0}{\partial \over \partial p}\left({kJ \over \sigma p}\right)}}$ (13)

If for simplicity ${J}$ were set to 0, eliminating ${\omega}$ in equations (11) and (13) yields

${{ \left({\nabla^2 + {{\partial \over \partial p} \left({{f_0^2 \over \sigma}{\partial \over \partial p}}\right)}}\right){\chi}}=-{{f_0}{\mathbf{V_g} \cdot \nabla}\left({{{1 \over f_0}{\nabla^2 \Phi}}+f}\right)}-{{\partial \over \partial p}\left({{-}{f_0^2 \over \sigma}{\mathbf{V_g} \cdot \nabla}\left({\partial \Phi \over \partial p}\right)}\right)}}$ (14)

Equation (14) is often referred to as the geopotential tendency equation. It relates the local geopotential tendency (term A) to the vorticity advection distribution (term B) and thickness advection (term C).

=== The same identity using the quasi-geostrophic potential vorticity ===
Using the chain rule of differentiation, term C can be written as

${-{{\mathbf{V_g} \cdot \nabla}{\partial \over \partial p}\left({{f_0^2 \over \sigma}{\partial \Phi \over \partial p}}\right)}-{{f_0^2 \over \sigma}{\partial \mathbf{V_g} \over \partial p}{\cdot \nabla}{\partial \Phi \over \partial p}}}$ (15)

But based on the thermal wind relation,

$${{f_0{\partial \mathbf{V_g} \over \partial p}}={\hat{\mathbf{k}} \times \nabla \left({\partial \Phi \over \partial p} \right)}}$$.

In other words,${\partial \mathbf{V_g} \over \partial p}$ is perpendicular to ${\nabla ({\partial \Phi \over \partial p})}$ and the second term in equation (15) disappears.

The first term can be combined with term B in equation (14) which, upon division by ${f_0}$ can be expressed in the form of a conservation equation

${{\left({{\partial \over \partial t}+{\mathbf{V_g} \cdot \nabla}}\right)q}={D_g q \over Dt}=0}$ (16)

where ${q}$ is the quasi-geostrophic potential vorticity defined by

${q = {{{1 \over f_0}{\nabla^2 \Phi}}+{f}+{{\partial \over \partial p}\left({{f_0 \over \sigma}{\partial \Phi \over \partial p}}\right)}}}$ (17)

The three terms of equation (17) are, from left to right, the geostrophic relative vorticity, the planetary vorticity and the stretching vorticity.

== Implications ==
As an air parcel moves about in the atmosphere, its relative, planetary and stretching vorticities may change but equation (17) shows that the sum of the three must be conserved following the geostrophic motion.

Equation (17) can be used to find ${q}$ from a known field ${\Phi}$. Alternatively, it can also be used to predict the evolution of the geopotential field given an initial distribution of ${\Phi}$ and suitable boundary conditions by using an inversion process.

More importantly, the quasi-geostrophic system reduces the five-variable primitive equations to a one-equation system where all variables such as ${u_g}$, ${v_g}$ and ${T}$ can be obtained from ${q}$ or height ${\Phi}$.

Also, because ${\zeta_g}$ and ${\mathbf{V_g}}$ are both defined in terms of ${\Phi(x,y,p,t)}$, the vorticity equation can be used to diagnose vertical motion provided that the fields of both ${\Phi}$ and ${\partial \Phi \over \partial t}$ are known.
