= Frontolysis =

Weakening and dissipation of a weather front

A visual demonstration of how frontolysis is displayed on surface weather analysis maps, for both cold fronts and warm fronts

Frontolysis (also known as Frontal decay) in meteorology, is the dissipation or weakening of an atmospheric front. It is generally described as a decrease in temperature gradients between colliding air masses or can be caused by a shift in wind pattern. In contrary to areas of "Frontogenesis", the areas where air masses diverge are called areas of frontolysis.

On surface weather analysis maps, frontolysis is usually displayed as a dashed line with frontal markers on every second dash in the movement direction of the front. Typically, frontal markers are triangles for cold fronts and semicircles for warm fronts.

== See also ==
- Frontogenesis
- Outflow boundary
