= Geostrophic balance =

Balance between the pressure gradient and Coriolis forces

An example of a geostrophic flow in the Northern Hemisphere.

Geostrophic balance (/ˌdʒiːəˈstrɒfɪk, ˌdʒiːoʊ-, -ˈstroʊ-/), also known as geostrophic equilibrium or geostrophy, is an exact balance between the Coriolis force and the pressure gradient force. In atmospheric science, the geostrophic wind is the theoretical wind that would result from this balance. A geostrophic current is an oceanic current in which the pressure gradient force is balanced by the Coriolis effect. The direction of geostrophic flow is parallel to the isobars (lines of constant pressure at a given height), with the high pressure to the right of the flow in the Northern Hemisphere, and the high pressure to the left in the Southern Hemisphere. The concept is familiar from weather maps, whose isobars show the direction of geostrophic winds.

This balance seldom holds exactly in nature. The true wind almost always differs from the geostrophic wind due to other forces such as friction from the ground. Thus, the actual wind would equal the geostrophic wind only if there were no friction (e.g. above the atmospheric boundary layer) and the isobars were perfectly straight. The geostrophic wind merely reflects the horizontal pressure gradient as the driving force of atmospheric motion, while the actual near-surface wind requires the synergistic modulation of multiple factors including the frictional force, vertical atmospheric stratification and thermal wind. As a result, the ratio between actual wind speed and geostrophic wind speed, and the wind direction angle difference between the actual wind and the geostrophic wind vary significantly with environmental conditions. Despite this, much of the atmosphere outside the tropics is close to geostrophic flow much of the time and it is a valuable first approximation.

The principle of geostrophic balance is useful to oceanographers because it allows them to infer ocean currents from measurements of the sea surface height (by combined satellite altimetry and gravimetry) or from vertical profiles of seawater density taken by ships or autonomous buoys. The major currents of the world's oceans including the Gulf Stream, the Kuroshio Current, the Agulhas Current, and the Antarctic Circumpolar Current, are approximately in geostrophic balance and examples of geostrophic currents.

Geostrophic flows may be barotropic or baroclinic. Geostrophic flow in air or water is a zero-frequency inertial wave.

== Origin ==
A useful heuristic is to imagine air starting from rest, experiencing a force directed from areas of high pressure toward areas of low pressure, called the pressure gradient force. If the air began to move in response to that force, however, the Coriolis force would deflect it, to the right of the motion in the Northern Hemisphere or to the left in the Southern Hemisphere. As the air accelerated, the deflection would increase until the Coriolis force's strength and direction balanced the pressure gradient force, a state called geostrophic balance. At this point, the flow is no longer moving from high to low pressure, but instead moves along isobars. Geostrophic balance helps to explain why, in the Northern Hemisphere, low-pressure systems (or cyclones) spin counterclockwise and high-pressure systems (or anticyclones) spin clockwise, and the opposite in the Southern Hemisphere.

== Geostrophic currents ==
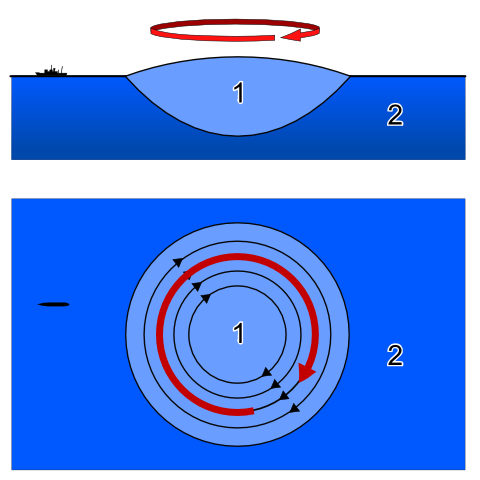
A northern-hemisphere gyre in geostrophic balance; paler water is less dense than dark water, but more dense than air; the outwards pressure gradient is balanced by the 90 degrees-right-of-flow Coriolis force. The structure will eventually dissipate due to friction and mixing of water properties.

Flow of ocean water is also largely geostrophic. Just as multiple weather balloons that measure pressure as a function of height in the atmosphere are used to map the atmospheric pressure field and infer the geostrophic wind, measurements of density as a function of depth in the ocean are used to infer geostrophic currents. Satellite altimeters are also used to measure sea surface height anomaly, which permits a calculation of the geostrophic current at the surface.

Seawater naturally tends to move from a region of high pressure (or high sea level) to a region of low pressure (or low sea level). The force pushing the water towards the low pressure region is called the pressure gradient force. In a geostrophic flow, instead of water moving from a region of high pressure (or high sea level) to a region of low pressure (or low sea level), it moves along the lines of equal pressure (isobars). That occurs because the Earth rotates. The rotation of the Earth results in a "force" being felt by the water moving from the high to the low, known as a Coriolis force. The Coriolis force acts at right angles to the flow, and when it balances the pressure gradient force, the resulting flow is known as geostrophic.

As mentioned, the direction of flow is with the high pressure to the right of the flow in the Northern Hemisphere, and the high pressure to the left in the Southern Hemisphere. The direction of the flow depends on the hemisphere, because the direction of the Coriolis force is opposite in the different hemispheres.

== Limitations of the geostrophic approximation ==
The effect of friction, between the air and the land, breaks the geostrophic balance. Friction slows the flow, lessening the effect of the Coriolis force. As a result, the pressure gradient force has a greater effect and the air still moves from high pressure to low pressure, though with great deflection. This explains why high-pressure system winds radiate out from the center of the system, while low-pressure systems have winds that spiral inwards.

The geostrophic wind neglects frictional effects, which is usually a good approximation for the synoptic scale instantaneous flow in the midlatitude mid-troposphere. Although ageostrophic terms are relatively small, they are essential for the time evolution of the flow and in particular are necessary for the growth and decay of storms. Quasigeostrophic and semigeostrophic theory are used to model flows in the atmosphere more widely. These theories allow for a divergence to take place and for weather systems to then develop.

== Formulation ==
The geostrophic equations are a simplified form of the Navier–Stokes equations in a rotating reference frame. In particular, it is assumed that there is no acceleration (steady-state), no viscosity, and that the pressure is hydrostatic. The resulting balance is (Gill 1982):

$$fv = \frac{1}{\rho} \frac{\partial p}{\partial x}$$

$$fu = -\frac{1}{\rho} \frac{\partial p}{\partial y}$$

where $f$ is the Coriolis parameter, $\rho$ is the density, $p$ is the pressure and $u,v$ are the velocities in the $x,y$-directions respectively.

One special property of the geostrophic equations is that they satisfy the incompressible version of the continuity equation. That is:
$$\nabla \cdot \mathbf{u} = 0$$

$$\frac{\partial u}{\partial x} + \frac{\partial v}{\partial y} = 0$$

=== Derivation ===
Newton's second law can be written as follows if only the pressure gradient, gravity, and friction act on an air parcel, where bold symbols are vectors:

$${D\boldsymbol{U} \over Dt} = - {1 \over \rho} \nabla p - 2\boldsymbol{\Omega} \times \boldsymbol{U} + \boldsymbol{g} + \boldsymbol{F}_r$$

Here U is the velocity field of the air, Ω is the angular velocity vector of the planet, ρ is the density of the air, p is the air pressure, F_{r} is the friction, g is the acceleration vector due to gravity and D/Dt is the material derivative.

Locally this can be expanded in Cartesian coordinates, with a positive u representing an eastward direction and a positive v representing a northward direction. Neglecting friction and vertical motion, as justified by the Taylor–Proudman theorem, we have:

$${Du \over Dt} = -{1 \over \rho}{\partial p \over \partial x} + fv + 0 + 0$$
$${Dv \over Dt} = -{1 \over \rho}{\partial p \over \partial y} - fu + 0 + 0$$
$${D w \over Dt}=-{1 \over \rho}{\partial p \over \partial z}+0-g+0$$

With f = 2Ω sin φ the Coriolis parameter (approximately 10^{−4} s^{−1}, varying with latitude).

Assuming geostrophic balance, the system is stationary and the first two equations become:

$$fv = {1 \over \rho}{\partial p \over \partial x}$$
$$fu =  -{1 \over \rho}{\partial p \over \partial y}$$
$$-g -{1 \over \rho}{\partial p \over \partial z}=0$$

By substituting using the third equation above, we have:

$$\begin{align}
fv &= \frac{\; -g \;}{\; \frac{\partial p}{\partial z} \;} \frac{\partial p}{\partial x} := \frac{\; -g \;}{\; c \;} a \\[5px]
fu &= - \frac{\; -g \;}{\; \frac{\partial p}{\partial z} \;} \frac{\partial p}{\partial y} :=  + \frac{\; g \;}{\; c \;}b
\end{align}$$

with z the geopotential height of the constant pressure surface, satisfying

$${\rm d}p={\partial p \over \partial x}{\rm d}x + {\partial p \over \partial y}{\rm d} y + {\partial p \over \partial z}{\rm d}z  :=  a{\rm d} x+b{\rm d} y+c{\rm d} z = 0$$

Further simplify those formulae above:

$$\begin{align}
fv & = \frac{\; -g \;}{\; c \;} a = +g\biggl( \frac{{\rm d } z}{ {\rm d} x}\biggr)_{{\rm d}y=0} \\[5px]
fu &= + \frac{\; g \;}{\; c \;}b = -g\biggl(\frac{{\rm d} z}{{\rm d} y}\biggr)_{{\rm d} x=0}
\end{align}$$

This leads us to the following result for the geostrophic wind components:

$$v_g = {g \over f}  {{\rm d}z \over {\rm d} x}$$

$$u_g = - {g \over f}  {{\rm d} z \over {\rm d} y}$$

The validity of this approximation depends on the local Rossby number. It is invalid at the equator, because f is equal to zero there, and therefore generally not used in the tropics.

Other variants of the equation are possible; for example, the geostrophic wind vector can be expressed in terms of the gradient of the geopotential Φ on a surface of constant pressure:

$$\mathbf{V}_\mathrm{g} = \frac\hat\mathbf{k}{f} \times \nabla_p \Phi$$

=== Rotating waves of zero frequency ===
The equations governing a linear, rotating shallow water wave are:

$$\frac{\partial u}{\partial t} - fv = -\frac{1}{\rho} \frac{\partial p}{\partial x}$$

$$\frac{\partial v}{\partial t} + fu = -\frac{1}{\rho} \frac{\partial p}{\partial y}$$

The assumption of steady-state (no net acceleration) is:

$$\frac{\partial u}{\partial t} = \frac{\partial v}{\partial t} =0$$

Alternatively, we can assume a wave-like, periodic, dependence in time:

$$u \propto v \propto e^{i \omega t}$$

In this case, if we set $\omega = 0$, we have reverted to the geostrophic equations above. Thus a geostrophic current can be thought of as a rotating shallow water wave with a frequency of zero.

== See also ==
- Gradient wind
- Prevailing winds
- Thermal wind
