= Inertial wave =

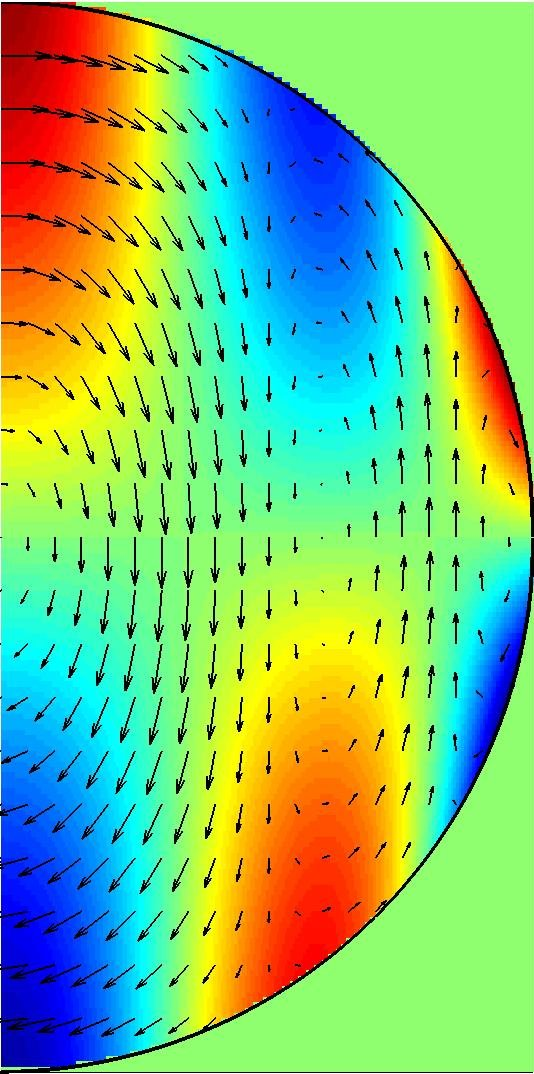
Equatorial Inertial wave pulse caused patterns of fluid flow inside a steadily-rotating spherical chamber. Arrows on this cross section show the direction and strength of flow in the equatorial plane as the sphere continues to rotate clockwise on its axis which shown at left . Red indicates flow out of the plane; blue indicates flow into the plane.

Inertial waves, also known as inertial oscillations, are a type of mechanical wave possible in rotating fluids. Unlike surface gravity waves commonly seen at the beach or in the bathtub, inertial waves flow through the interior of the fluid, not at the surface. Like any other kind of wave, an inertial wave is caused by a restoring force and characterized by its wavelength and frequency. Because the restoring force for inertial waves is the Coriolis force, their wavelengths and frequencies are related in a peculiar way. Inertial waves are transverse. Most commonly they are observed in atmospheres, oceans, lakes, and laboratory experiments. Rossby waves, geostrophic currents, and geostrophic winds are examples of inertial waves. Inertial waves are also likely to exist in the molten core of the rotating Earth.

== Restoring force ==
Inertial waves are restored to equilibrium by the Coriolis force, a result of rotation. To be precise, the Coriolis force arises (along with the centrifugal force) in a rotating frame to account for the fact that such a frame is always accelerating. Inertial waves, therefore, cannot exist without rotation. More complicated than tension on a string, the Coriolis force acts at a 90° angle to the direction of motion, and its strength depends on the rotation rate of the fluid. These two properties lead to the peculiar characteristics of inertial waves.

== Characteristics ==
Inertial waves are possible only when a fluid is rotating, and exist in the bulk of the fluid, not at its surface. Like light waves, inertial waves are transverse, which means that their vibrations occur perpendicular to the direction of wave travel. One peculiar geometrical characteristic of inertial waves is that their phase velocity, which describes the movement of the crests and troughs of the wave, is perpendicular to their group velocity, which is a measure of the propagation of energy.

Whereas a sound wave or an electromagnetic wave of any frequency is possible, inertial waves can exist only over the range of frequencies from zero to twice the rotation rate of the fluid. Moreover, the frequency of the wave is determined by its direction of travel. Waves traveling perpendicular to the axis of rotation have zero frequency and are sometimes called the geostrophic modes. Waves traveling parallel to the axis have maximum frequency (twice the rotation rate), and waves at intermediate angles have intermediate frequencies. In free space, an inertial wave can exist at any frequency between 0 and twice the rotation rate. A closed container, however, can impose restrictions on the possible frequencies of inertial waves, as it can for any kind of wave. Inertial waves in a closed container are often called inertial modes. In a sphere, for example, the inertial modes are forced to take on discrete frequencies, leaving gaps where no modes can exist.

== Examples of inertial waves ==
Any kind of fluid can support inertial waves: water, oil, liquid metals, air, and other gases. Inertial waves are observed most commonly in planetary atmospheres (Rossby waves, geostrophic winds) and in oceans and lakes (geostrophic currents), where they are responsible for much of the mixing that takes place. Inertial waves affected by the slope of the ocean floor are often called Rossby waves. Inertial waves can be observed in laboratory experiments or in industrial flows where a fluid is rotating. Inertial waves are also likely to exist in the liquid outer core of the Earth, and at least one group has claimed evidence of them. Similarly, inertial waves are likely in rotating astronomical flows like stars, accretion disks, planetary rings, and galaxies.

== Mathematical description ==
Fluid flow is governed by the Navier-Stokes equation for momentum. The flow velocity $\vec{u}$ of a fluid with viscosity $\nu$ under pressure $P$ and rotating at rate $\Omega$ changes over time $t$ according to

$$\frac{\partial \vec{u}}{\partial t}
+ (\vec{u} \cdot \vec{\nabla}) \vec{u}
= - \frac{1}{\rho} \vec{\nabla}P
+ \nu \nabla^2 \vec{u}
- 2\vec{\Omega} \times \vec{u}.$$

The first term on the right accounts for pressure, the second accounts for viscous diffusion and the third (last) term on the right side of the momentum equation (above) is the Coriolis term.

To be precise, $\vec{u}$ is the flow velocity as observed in the rotating frame of reference. Since a rotating frame of reference is accelerating (i.e. non-inertial frame), two additional (pseudo) forces (as mentioned above) emerge as a result of this coordinate transformation: the centrifugal force and the Coriolis force. In the equation above, the centrifugal force is included as a part of the generalized pressure $P$, that is, $P$ is related to the usual pressure $p$, depending on the distance from the rotation axis $r$, by

$$P = p + \frac{1}{2} \rho r^2 \Omega^2.$$

In the case where the rotation rate is large, the Coriolis force and the centrifugal force become large compared to the other terms. Being small in comparison, diffusion and the "convective derivative" (second term on the left) can be left out. Taking a curl of both sides and applying a few vector identities, the result is

$$\frac{\partial}{\partial t} \nabla \times \vec{u}
= 2 ( \vec{\Omega} \cdot \vec{\nabla} ) \vec{u}.$$

One class of solutions to this equation are waves that satisfy two conditions. First, if $\vec{k}$ is the wave vector,

$$\vec{u} \cdot \vec{k} = 0,$$

that is, the waves must be transverse, as mentioned above. Second, solutions are required to have a frequency $\omega$ that satisfies the dispersion relation

$$\omega = 2 \hat{k} \cdot \vec{\Omega} = 2 \Omega \cos{\theta},$$

where $\theta$ is the angle between the axis of rotation and the direction of the wave. These particular solutions are known as inertial waves.

The dispersion relation looks much like the Coriolis term in the momentum equation—notice the rotation rate and the factor of two. It immediately implies the range of possible frequencies for inertial waves, as well as the dependence of their frequency on their direction.
