= Nephanalysis =

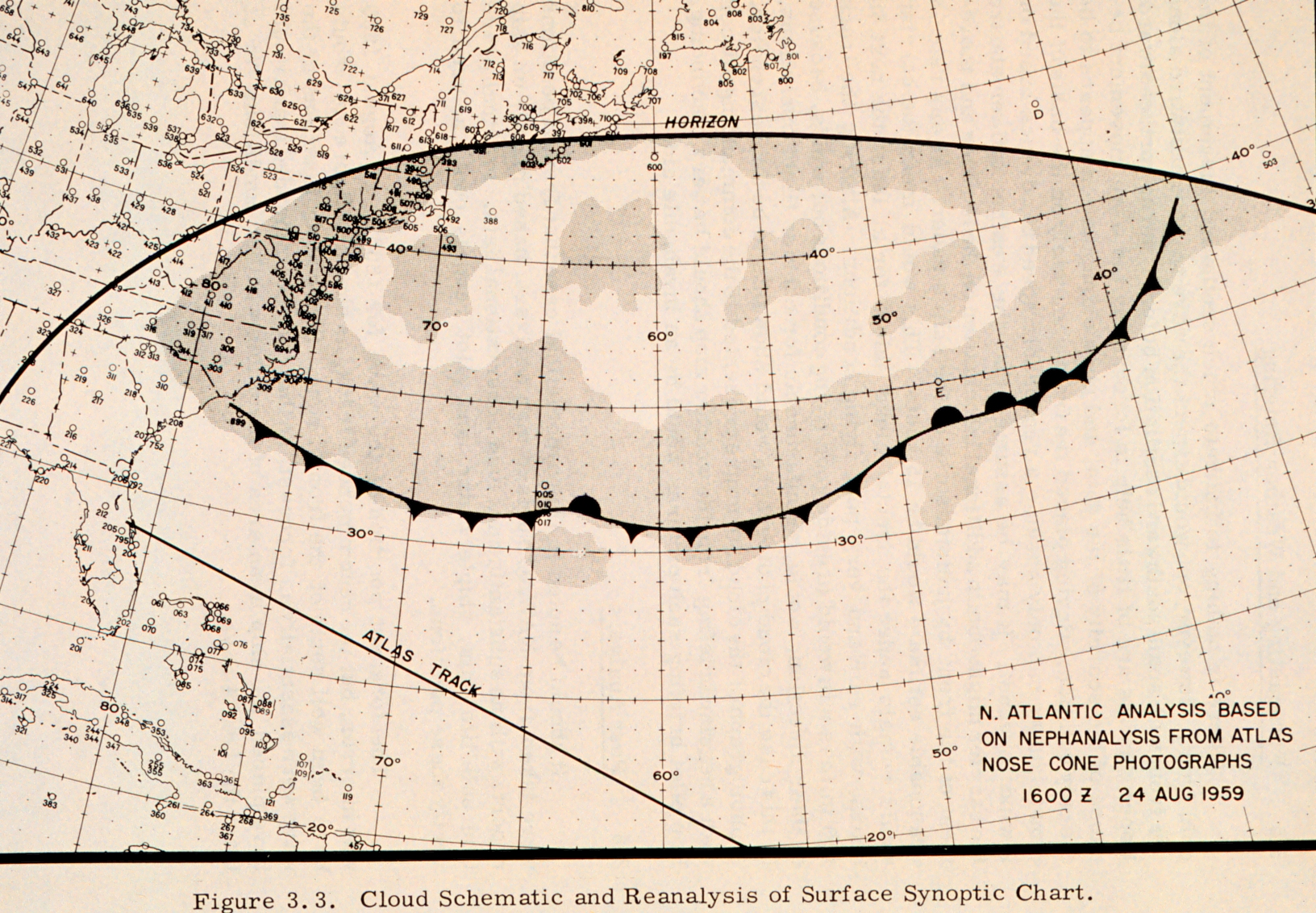
A nephanalysis of the North Atlantic based on photographs taken on a rocket launch in 1959

A nephanalysis or neph chart is a type of synoptic chart plotting the types and amount of clouds and precipitation. Nephanalyses may map cloud cover, the altitudes of cloud tops, or cloud ceilings, incorporating data from surface, aerial, and satellite observations. The earliest nephanalyses were based on cloud reports from surface weather stations and were used to study the structure of weather fronts. Satellite observations largely supplanted surface observations for most applications of nephanalysis after 1960, though surface reports remained critical for information relating to cloud bases. The first satellite-based nephanalyses were hand-drawn based on a meteorologist's interpretation of images largely taken in visible light. Nephanalyses based on infrared satellite imagery and automated analyses later emerged as data weather satellites became increasingly abundant.

A nephanalysis can be used to avoid hazardous weather areas, by ships preparing routes for cruises, and to locate good fishing areas. This technique is rarely performed in modern forecasting, due to the prevalence of worldwide satellite imagery.
