= Deformation (meteorology) =

Weather phenomenon

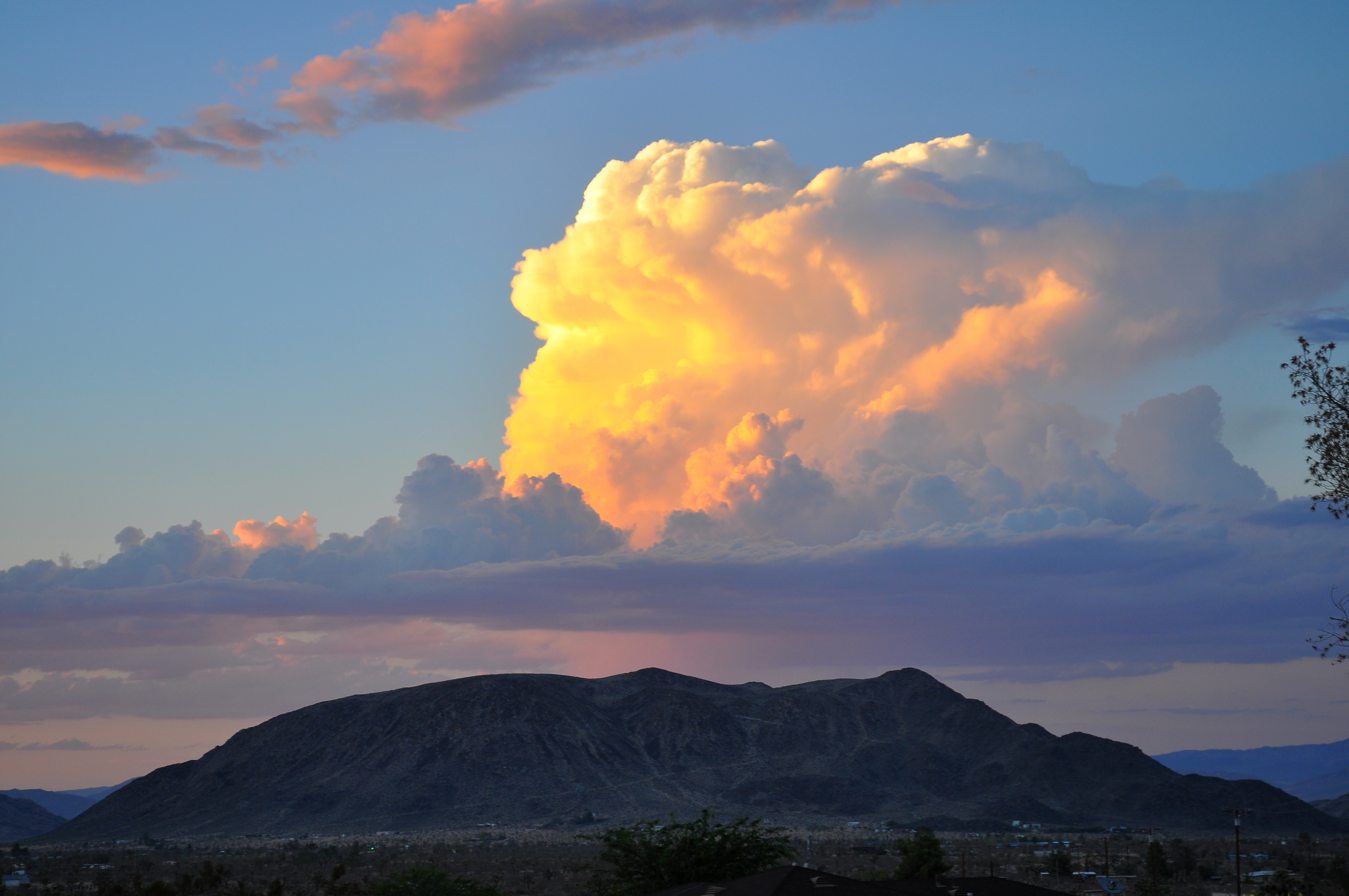
A cloud appears to set be place by a human hand

Deformation is the rate of change of shape of fluid bodies. Meteorologically, this quantity is very important in the formation of atmospheric fronts, in the explanation of cloud shapes, and in the diffusion of materials and properties.

== Equations ==
The deformation of horizontal wind is defined as $\operatorname{def} \mathbf{V} = \sqrt{A^2 + B^2}$, where $\ A = \frac{\partial v}{\partial x} + \frac{\partial u}{\partial y}$ and $\ B = \frac{\partial u}{\partial x} - \frac{\partial v}{\partial y}$, representing the derivatives of wind component. Because these derivatives vary greatly with the rotation of the coordinate system, so do $\ A$ and $\ B$.

== Stretching direction ==
The deformation elements $\ A$ and $\ B$ (above) can be used to find the direction of the dilatation axis, the line along which the material elements stretch (also known as the stretching direction). Several flow patterns are characteristic of large deformation: confluence, diffluence, and shear flow. Confluence, also known as stretching, is the elongating of a fluid body along the flow (streamline convergence). Diffluence, also known as shearing, is the elongating of a fluid body normal to the flow (streamline divergence).

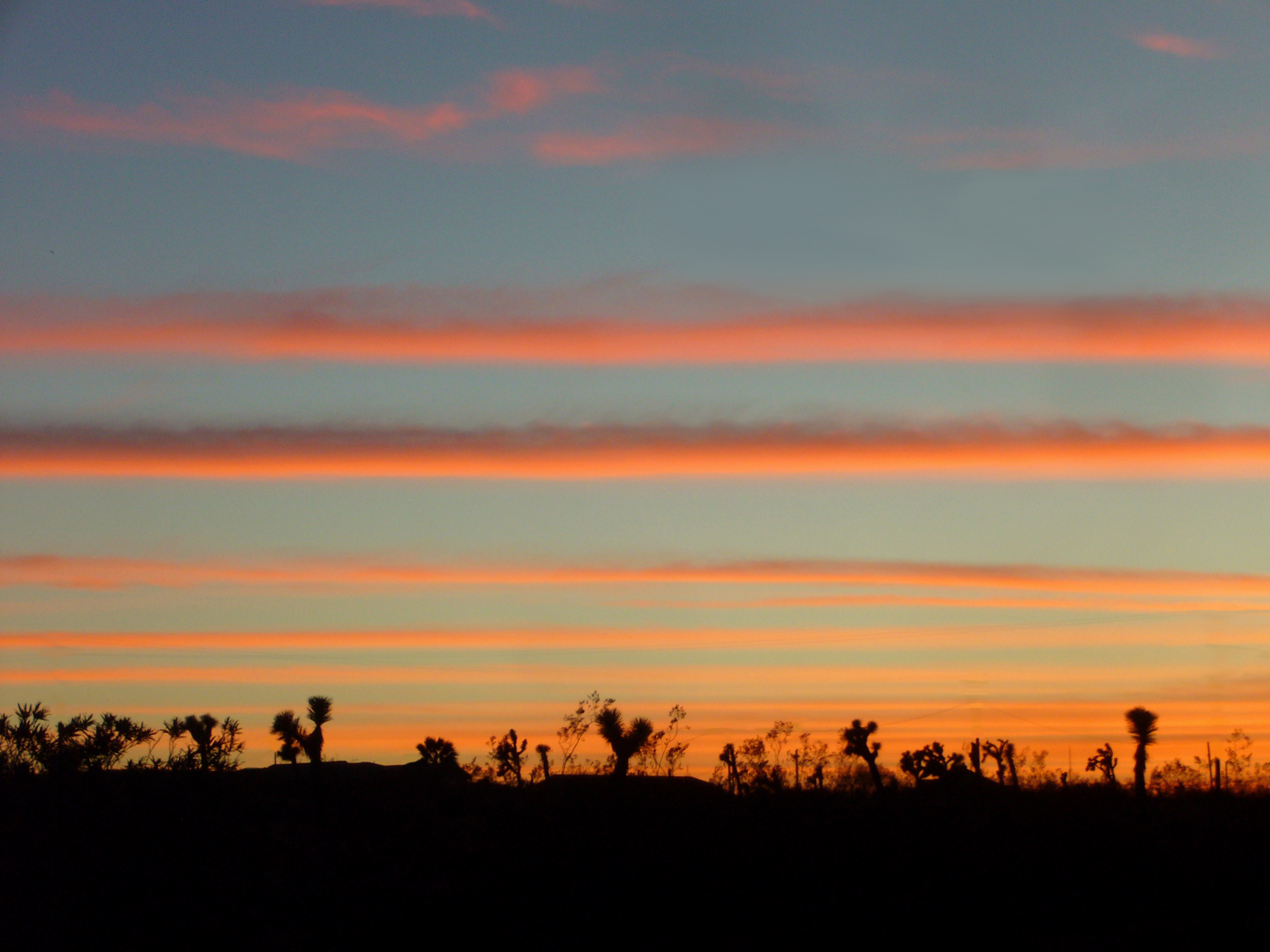
Extreme cloud confluence

== See also ==
- Wind shear
- Convergence zone
- Divergence
