= Ageostrophy =

Difference between the actual wind and the geostrophic wind

Ageostrophy (or ageostrophic flow) is the difference between the actual wind or current and the geostrophic wind or geostrophic current. Since geostrophy is an exact balance between the Coriolis force and the pressure gradient force, ageostrophic flow reflects an imbalance, and thus is often implicated in disturbances, vertical motions (important for weather), and rapid changes with time. Ageostrophic flow reflects the existence of all the other terms in the momentum equation neglected in that idealization, including friction and material acceleration Dv/Dt, which includes the centrifugal force in curved flow.

== See also ==
- geostrophic
- geostrophic wind
