= Thermal wind =

Vector difference of geostrophic wind movement at high and low altitudes

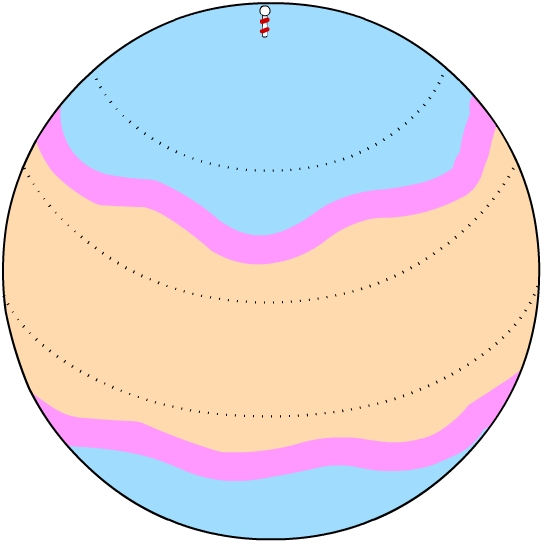
Jet streams (shown in pink) are well-known examples of thermal wind. They arise from the horizontal temperature gradients between the warm tropics and the colder polar regions.

In atmospheric science, the thermal wind is the vector difference between the geostrophic wind at upper altitudes minus that at lower altitudes in the atmosphere. It is the hypothetical vertical wind shear that would exist if the winds obey geostrophic balance in the horizontal, while pressure obeys hydrostatic balance in the vertical. The combination of these two force balances is called thermal wind balance, a term generalizable also to more complicated horizontal flow balances such as gradient wind balance.

Since the geostrophic wind at a given pressure level flows along geopotential height contours on a map, and the geopotential thickness of a pressure layer is proportional to virtual temperature, it follows that the thermal wind flows along thickness or temperature contours. For instance, the thermal wind associated with pole-to-equator temperature gradients is the primary physical explanation for the jet stream in the upper half of the troposphere, which is the atmospheric layer extending from the surface of the planet up to altitudes of about 12–15 km.

Mathematically, the thermal wind relation defines a vertical wind shear – a variation in wind speed or direction with height. The wind shear in this case is a function of a horizontal temperature gradient, which is a variation in temperature over some horizontal distance. Also called baroclinic flow, the thermal wind varies with height in proportion to the horizontal temperature gradient. The thermal wind relation results from hydrostatic balance and geostrophic balance in the presence of a temperature gradient along constant pressure surfaces, or isobars.

The term thermal wind was originally proposed by British meteorologist Ernest Gold. It is often considered a misnomer, since it really describes the change in wind with height, rather than the wind itself. However, one can view the thermal wind as a geostrophic wind that varies with height, so that the term wind seems appropriate. In the early years of meteorology, when data was scarce, the wind field could be estimated using the thermal wind relation and knowledge of a surface wind speed and direction as well as thermodynamic soundings aloft. In this way, the thermal wind relation acts to define the wind itself, rather than just its shear. Many authors retain the thermal wind moniker, even though it describes a wind gradient, sometimes offering a clarification to that effect.

== Description ==
=== Physical explanation ===
The thermal wind is the change in the amplitude or sign of the geostrophic wind due to a horizontal temperature gradient. The geostrophic wind is an idealized wind that results from a balance of forces along a horizontal dimension. Whenever the Earth's rotation plays a dominant role in fluid dynamics, as in the mid-latitudes, a balance between the Coriolis force and the pressure-gradient force develops. Intuitively, a horizontal difference in pressure pushes air across that difference in a similar way that the horizontal difference in the height of a hill causes objects to roll downhill. However, the Coriolis force intervenes and nudges the air towards the right (in the northern hemisphere). This is illustrated in panel (a) of the figure below. The balance that develops between these two forces results in a flow that parallels the horizontal pressure difference, or pressure gradient. In addition, when forces acting in the vertical dimension are dominated by the vertical pressure-gradient force and the gravitational force, hydrostatic balance occurs.

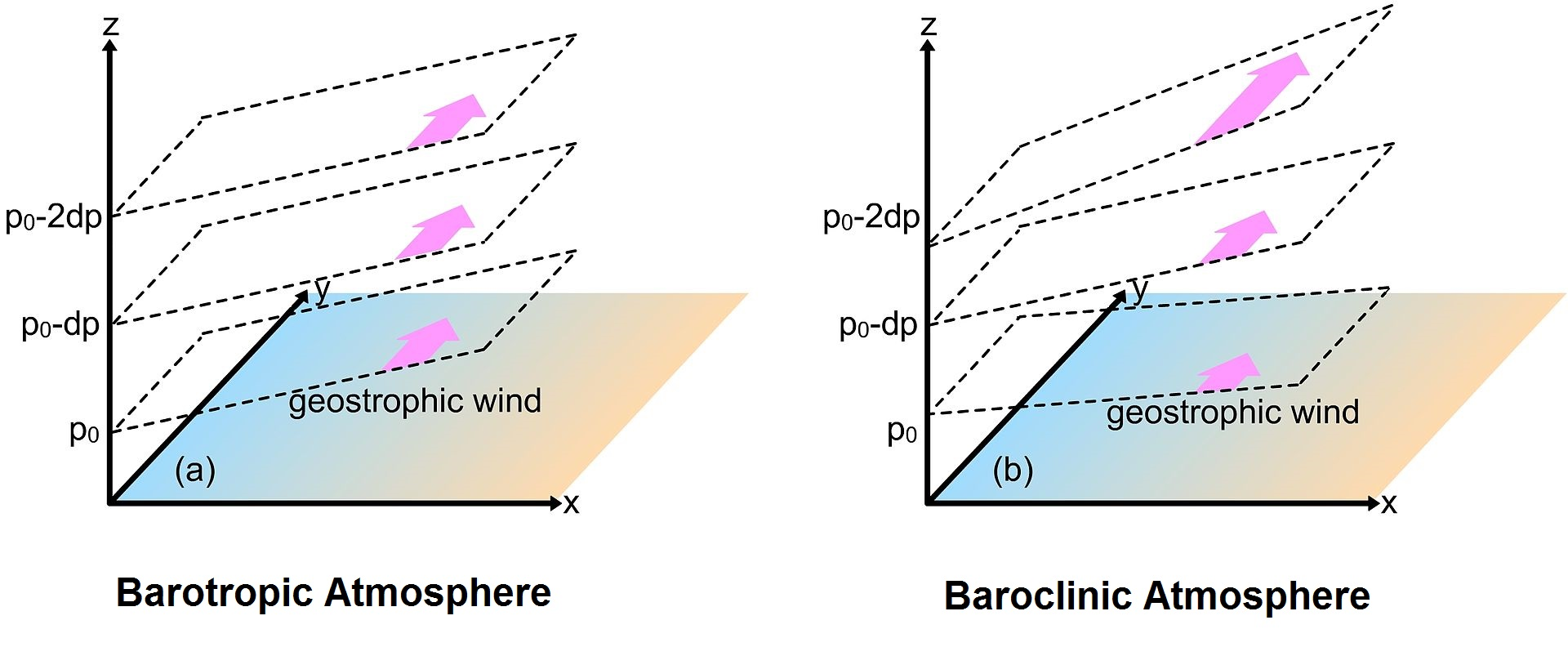
The geostrophic wind on different isobaric levels in a barotropic atmosphere (a) and in a baroclinic atmosphere (b). The blue portion of the surface denotes a cold region while the orange portion denotes a warm region. This temperature structure is restricted to the surface in (a) but extends through the depth of the fluid in (b). The dotted lines enclose isobaric surfaces which remain at constant slope with increasing height in (a) and increase in slope with height in (b). Pink arrows illustrate the direction and amplitude of the horizontal wind. Only in the baroclinic atmosphere (b) do these vary with height. Such variation illustrates the thermal wind.

In a barotropic atmosphere, where density is a function only of pressure, a horizontal pressure gradient will drive a geostrophic wind that is constant with height. However, if a horizontal temperature gradient exists along isobars, the isobars will also vary with the temperature. In the mid-latitudes there often is a positive coupling between pressure and temperature. Such a coupling causes the slope of the isobars to increase with height, as illustrated in panel (b) of the figure to the left. Because isobars are steeper at higher elevations, the associated pressure gradient force is stronger there. However, the Coriolis force is the same, so the resulting geostrophic wind at higher elevations must be greater in the direction of the pressure force.

In a baroclinic atmosphere, where density is a function of both pressure and temperature, such horizontal temperature gradients can exist. The difference in horizontal wind speed with height that results is a vertical wind shear, traditionally called the thermal wind.

=== Mathematical formalism ===
The geopotential thickness of an atmospheric layer defined by two different pressures is described by the hypsometric equation:

$$\Phi_1 - \Phi_0 = \ R \overline{T} \ln \left [ \frac{p_0}{p_1} \right ],$$

where $R$ is the specific gas constant for air, $\Phi_n$ is the geopotential at pressure level $p_n$, and $\overline{T}$ is the vertically-averaged temperature of the layer. This formula shows that the layer thickness is proportional to the temperature. When there is a horizontal temperature gradient, the thickness of the layer would be greatest where the temperature is greatest.

Differentiating the geostrophic wind, $\mathbf{v}_g = \frac{1}{f} \mathbf{k} \times \nabla_p \Phi$ (where $f$ is the Coriolis parameter, $\mathbf{k}$ is the vertical unit vector, and the subscript "p" on the gradient operator denotes gradient on a constant pressure surface) with respect to pressure, and integrate from pressure level $p_0$ to $p_1$, we obtain the thermal wind equation:

$$\mathbf{v}_T = \frac{1}{f} \mathbf{k} \times \nabla_p ( \Phi_1 - \Phi_0 ).$$

Substituting the hypsometric equation, one gets a form based on temperature,

$$\mathbf{v}_T = \frac{R}{f} \ln \left [ \frac{p_0}{p_1}\right ] \mathbf{k} \times \nabla_p \overline{T}.$$

Note that thermal wind is at right angles to the horizontal temperature gradient, counter clockwise in the northern hemisphere. In the southern hemisphere, the change in sign of $f$ flips the direction.

== Examples ==
=== Advection turning ===
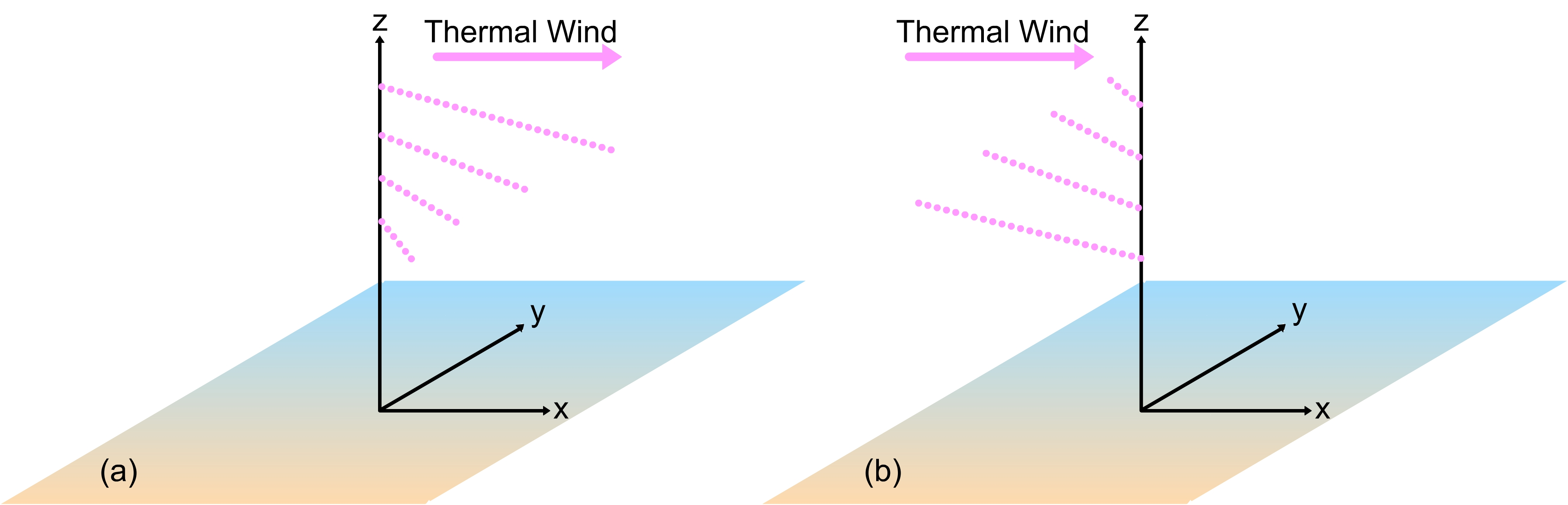
In (a), cold advection is occurring, so the thermal wind causes the geostrophic wind to rotate counterclockwise (for the northern hemisphere) with height. In (b), warm advection is occurring, so the geostrophic wind rotates clockwise with height.

If a component of the geostrophic wind is parallel to the temperature gradient, the thermal wind will cause the geostrophic wind to rotate with height. If geostrophic wind blows from cold air to warm air (cold advection) the geostrophic wind will turn counterclockwise with height (for the northern hemisphere), a phenomenon known as wind backing. Otherwise, if geostrophic wind blows from warm air to cold air (warm advection) the wind will turn clockwise with height, also known as wind veering.

Wind backing and veering allow an estimation of the horizontal temperature gradient with data from an atmospheric sounding.

=== Frontogenesis ===
As in the case of advection turning, when there is a cross-isothermal component of the geostrophic wind, a sharpening of the temperature gradient results. Thermal wind causes a deformation field and frontogenesis may occur.

=== Jet stream ===
A horizontal temperature gradient exists while moving North-South along a meridian because curvature of the Earth allows for more solar heating at the equator than at the poles. This creates a westerly geostrophic wind pattern to form in the mid-latitudes. Because thermal wind causes an increase in wind velocity with height, the westerly pattern increases in intensity up until the tropopause, creating a strong wind current known as the jet stream. The Northern and Southern Hemispheres exhibit similar jet stream patterns in the mid-latitudes.

The strongest part of jet streams should be in proximity where temperature gradients are the largest. Due to land masses in the northern hemisphere, largest temperature contrasts are observed on the east coast of North America (boundary between Canadian cold air mass and the Gulf Stream/warmer Atlantic) and Eurasia (boundary between the boreal winter monsoon/Siberian cold air mass and the warm Pacific). Therefore, the strongest boreal winter jet streams are observed over east coast of North America and Eurasia. Since stronger vertical shear promotes baroclinic instability, the most rapid development of extratropical cyclones (so called bombs) is also observed along the east coast of North America and Eurasia.

The lack of land masses in the Southern Hemisphere leads to a more constant jet with longitude (i.e. a more zonally symmetric jet).
