= Ekman (disambiguation) =

Ekman is a Swedish surname.

Ekman may also refer to:Ekman

- Ekman family
- Ekman layer
- Ekman spiral
- Ekman current meter
- Ekman transport
- Ekman number
- Ekman water bottle

== See also ==
- Eckman (disambiguation)
