= Weddell Polynya =

Gap in sea ice in the Southern Ocean

Coordinates: 75°S 45°W

The Weddell Polynya, or Weddell Sea Polynya, is a polynya, or irregular area of open water surrounded by sea ice, in the Weddell Sea of the Southern Ocean off Antarctica and near the Maud Rise. The formation of the polynya exposes relatively warmer ocean waters (at surface freezing temperatures of –1.9 °C) to a cold atmosphere, leading to a large exchange of heat which drives deep convection in the ocean, often reaching depths of 1,000 to 2,000 meters.

== Occurrences ==
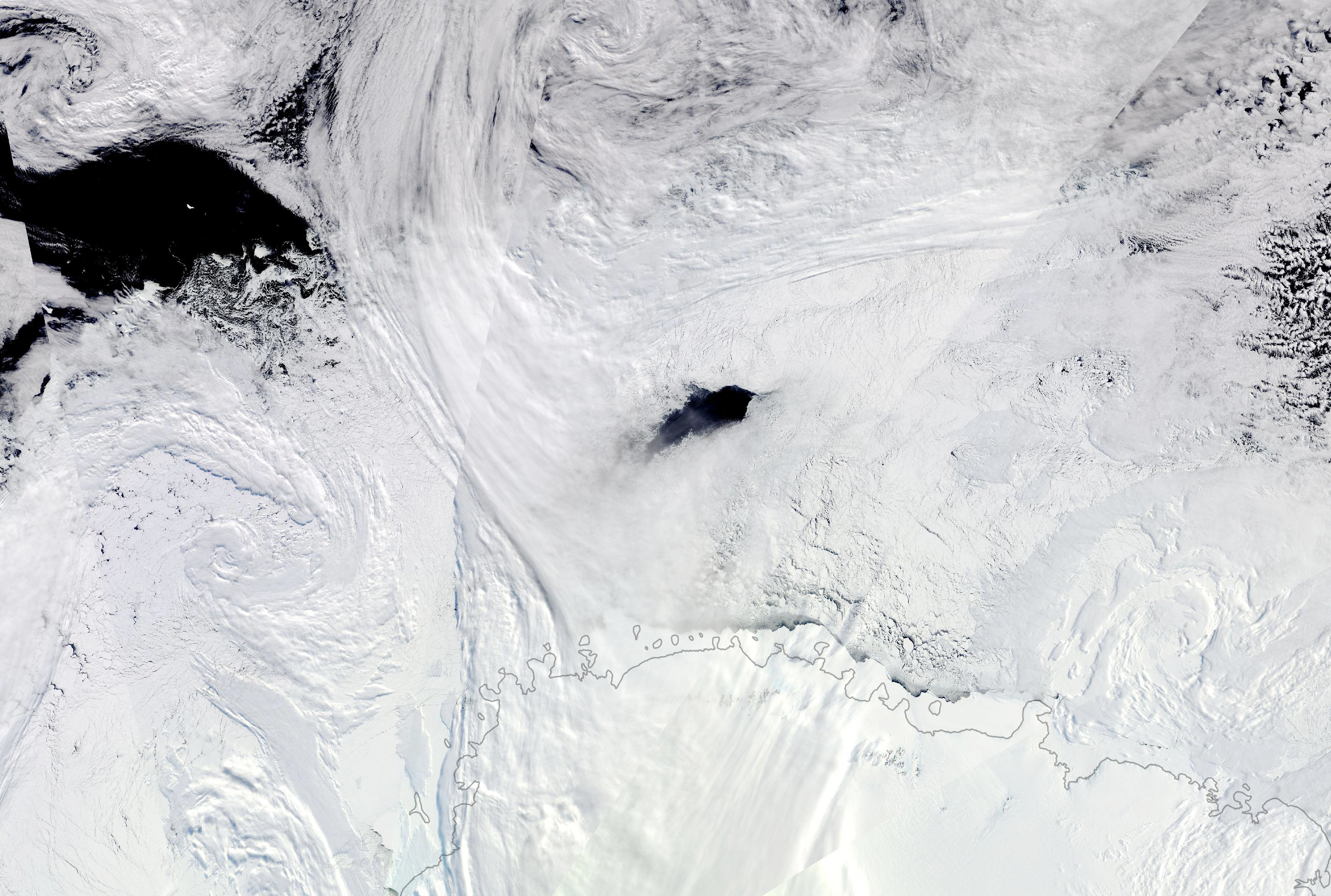
Maud Rise Polynya (center) pictured by the MODIS instrument on the Aqua (satellite) satellite, September 25, 2017

The size of New Zealand, it re-occurred each winter between 1974 and 1976. These were the first three austral winters observed by the Nimbus 5 Electrically Scanning Microwave Radiometer (ESMR). From 1976 to 2015, this polynya was rarely observed. The polynya reoccurred in 2016, and has since appeared in 2017. The 2010s occurrence has been smaller than the 1970s occurrence, being about the size of Maine in 2017, or roughly 80,000 km^{2} (31,000 mi^{2}).

Since the 1970s, the polar Southern Ocean south of the Antarctic Circumpolar Current has freshened and stratified, likely a result of anthropogenic climate change. Such stratification may be responsible for suppressing the return of the Weddell Sea polynya.

More recently, it was found that intense cyclones occurring over the ice pack, far south from the ice edge, were at the origin of the reoccurrence of the Weddell or Maud Rise Polynya in austral winter 2017. In certain winter months, the general atmospheric circulation around Antarctica exhibits a strong zonal wave 3 pattern, which favors the development of polar cyclones closer to the coast, that is, over preconditioned oceanographic areas for polynya formation, such as the Weddell Polynya in the Lazarev Sea and the Cosmonaut polynya in the Cosmonaut Sea around Antarctica.

== Other Antarctic polynyas ==
The presence of polynyas in McMurdo Sound provides an ice-free area where penguins can feed, and is therefore important for the survival of the Cape Royds penguin colony.

== See also ==
- Polar Cyclones
- Coriolis force
- Ekman layer
- Ekman number
- Ekman spiral
- Ekman transport
- Ekman velocity
- Fridtjof Nansen
- Nansen's Fram expedition
- Upwelling
- Vagn Walfrid Ekman
