= Ekman =

Ekman is a Swedish surname. Notable people with the surname include:

- Carl Daniel Ekman (1845–1904), Swedish chemical engineer
- Carl Gustaf Ekman (1872–1945), Swedish politician
- Elisabeth Ekman (1862–1936), Swedish botanist
- Erik Leonard Ekman (1883–1931), Swedish botanist
- Fam Ekman (born 1946), Swedish-Norwegian children's writer and illustrator
- Gösta Ekman (junior) (1939–2017), Swedish actor
- Gösta Ekman (senior) (1890–1938) Swedish actor
- Gustaf Ekman (1852 – 1930), Swedish chemist and oceanographer
- Hasse Ekman (1915–2004), Swedish film director and actor
- Hedda Ekman (1860–1929), Swedish writer and photographer
- Ida Ekman (1875–1942), Finnish soprano
- Kajsa Ekis Ekman (born 1980), Swedish journalist and writer
- Kerstin Ekman (born 1933), Swedish novelist
- Nils Ekman (born 1976), Swedish ice hockey player
- Paul Ekman (1934–2025), American psychologist
- Robert Wilhelm Ekman (1808–1873), Finnish painter
- Sheldon V. Ekman (1920–1982), American jurist
- Sven P. Ekman (1876–1964), Swedish zoologist
- Ulf Ekman (born 1950), Swedish clergyman
- Vagn Walfrid Ekman (1874–1954), Swedish oceanographer

== See also ==
- Eckmann, a surname
