= Eckman =

Eckman may refer to:

== People ==
- Carol Eckman (1938–1985), an American women's basketball coach
- Charley Eckman (1921–1995), an American basketball head coach and referee
- Chris Eckman of American band The Walkabouts
- Dan Eckman (born 1984), American director, writer, and producer
- Jeannette Eckman (1882–1972), American historian
- Rena Sarah Eckman (1868–1946), American dietitian
- Thomas Frederick Eckman, victim of Charles Whitman

== Places ==
- Eckman, West Virginia (McDowell County), an unincorporated community in the USA
- Eckmansville, Ohio (Adams County), an unincorporated community in the USA

== See also ==
- Eckmann, a surname
- Ekman (disambiguation)
