= Ekmanis =

Family name

Origin
- Origin: From the German language Eckmann

Ekmanis (feminine: Ekmane) is a Latvian surname of German origin (from the German surname Eckmann). Individuals with the surname include:

- Juris Ekmanis (1941–2016), Latvian physicist, former President of Latvian Academy of Sciences
- Zintis Ekmanis (born 1958), Latvian bobsledder
