= Ekman velocity =

Formula for wind induced water current velocity

In oceanography, Ekman velocity is part of the total horizontal velocity (u) induced by external frictional forcing on a boundary layer. It can be thought of as a residual ageostrophic velocity as it represents a deviation from geostrophy. Ekman appears most commonly when considering wind on the surface of an open body of water, such as the ocean. Here, the wind applies a frictional force, which in the non-inertial rotating reference frame of the earth, induces an apparent Coriolis force perpendicular to this frictional force in the horizontal plane. This results in a surface velocity that is 45° offset from the direction of the wind. Treating each subsequent thin layer of ocean depth wise as experiencing a similar frictional force applied by the layer above it, one can derive an Ekman spiral where the velocity rotates and decreases with depth. The total overall transport is perpendicular to the wind direction, leading to net transport of water. The total depth over which the frictional boundary force induces motion is named the Ekman layer.

The Ekman velocity is named after the Swedish oceanographer Vagn Walfrid Ekman (1874–1954).

== Theory ==
Through vertical eddy viscosity, winds act directly and frictionally on the Ekman layer, which typically is the upper 50–100m in the ocean. The frictional surface flow (u) is at an angle to the right of the wind in the northern hemisphere, to the left in the southern hemisphere (45 degrees if viscosity is uniform in the vertical z-direction). This surface flow then modifies the flow slightly beneath it, which then is slightly more to the right, and finally the exponentially-weaker-with-depth flow vectors die down at around 50–100 meters, and finally form a spiral, called the Ekman spiral. The angle of each successive layer downward through the spiral depends on the strength and vertical distribution of the vertical eddy viscosity.

When the contributions from all the vertical layers are added up – the integration of the velocity over depth, from the bottom to the top of the Ekman layer – the total "Ekman transport" is exactly 90 degrees to the right of the wind direction in the Northern Hemisphere and left in the Southern Hemisphere.

== Mathematical formulation ==
Suppose geostrophic balance is achieved in the Ekman layer, and wind stress is applied at the water surface:

$f\hat{\boldsymbol{z}}\times \boldsymbol{u}=-\nabla\phi+\frac{\partial \boldsymbol{\tau}}{\partial z},$ (1)

where $\phi=p/\rho_0,\,$ $\boldsymbol{\tau}$ is the applied stress divided by $\rho_0\,$ (the mean density of water in the Ekman layer)；$\hat{\boldsymbol{z}}$ is the unit vector in the vertical direction (opposing the direction of gravity).

The definition of Ekman velocity is the difference between the total horizontal velocity ($\boldsymbol{u}$) and the geostrophic velocity ($\boldsymbol{u}_g$):

$\boldsymbol{u}_e=\boldsymbol{u}-\boldsymbol{u}_g.$ (2)

As the geostrophic velocity ($\boldsymbol{u}_g$) is defined as

$\boldsymbol{u}_g=\frac{1}{f}\hat{\boldsymbol{z}}\times\nabla\phi,$ (3)

therefore

$f\hat{\boldsymbol{z}}\times\boldsymbol{u}_e=\frac{\partial \boldsymbol{\tau}}{\partial z}$ (4)

or

$\boldsymbol{u}_e=-\hat{\boldsymbol{z}}\times\Big(\frac{1}{f}\frac{\partial \boldsymbol{\tau}}{\partial z}\Big).$ (5)

Next, the Ekman transport is obtained by integrating the Ekman velocity from the bottom level ($z=z_b\,$) – at which the Ekman velocity vanishes – to the surface ($z=z_t\,$).

$\boldsymbol{U}_e=\int_{z_b}^{z_t} \boldsymbol{u}_e\; dz=-\hat{\boldsymbol{z}}\times\Big(\frac{\boldsymbol{\tau}_t-\boldsymbol{\tau}_b}{f}\Big).$ (6)

The SI unit of Ekman transport is: m^{2}·s^{−1}, which is the horizontal velocity integrated in the vertical direction.

== Observations ==
Typically, it takes about two days for the Ekman velocity to develop before it is directed at right angles to the wind.

== Usage ==
Based on Ekman theory and geostrophic dynamics, the analysis of near-surface currents, i.e. tropical Pacific near-surface currents, can be generated by using high resolution data of wind and altimeter sea level. The surface velocity is defined as the motion of a standard World Ocean Circulation Experiment/Tropical Ocean-Global Atmosphere (WOCE/TOGA) 15m drogue drifter. Near-surface Ekman velocity can be estimated with variables which best represent the ageostrophic motion of the WOCE/TOGA 15m drogue drifters relative to the surface wind stress. Geostrophic velocities are calculated with sea level gradients which are derived from TOPEX/Poseidon sea surface height analyses (TOPEX/Poseidon altimeter sea level anomalies from along-track data is used here, interpolated to 1°×1°grid, spanning the domain of 25°N-25°S,90°E-290°E, during Oct1992-Sep1998). Geostrophic and Ekman velocity are assumed to satisfy the lowest-order dynamics of the surface velocity, and they can be obtained independently from surface height and wind stress data. Standard f plan satisfies geostrophic balance, the lowest-order balance for quasi-steady circulation at higher latitudes. However, Coriolis parameter f is close to zero near the equator, the geostrophic balance is not satisfied as the velocity is proportional to the height gradient divided by the Coriolis parameter f. It has been shown in many studies that beta plane geostrophic approximation involving the second derivative of surface height is in good agreement with the observed velocities in the equatorial undercurrent, as a result, geostrophic currents which are near equator are obtained with a weighted blend of the equatorial beta-plane and conventional f-plane geostrophic equations.

A negative sea surface temperature (SST) anomaly prevails in the eastern equatorial Pacific from October to January. A zone of strong easterly Ekman flow propagates westward into the central Pacific basin near the date line during December–February. Relaxation of trade winds in the eastern coincided with the eastward propagation of the geostrophic flow east of 240°E (particularly in February), while westward currents dominated in the central and western equatorial region, which then reversal in the east, with weak local trade winds and weak upwelling along the coast, coincided with the onset of warm SST anomaly.(This anomaly first appeared off South America in March and April). Geostrophic current anomaly, like a Kelvin wave signature propagating eastward to South America between December and April can be easily discerned, and this arrival to South America also coincided with the above-mentioned SST anomaly onset. The geostrophic reversed in April to a strong eastward jet spanning the whole equatorial Pacific. As the El Niño SST anomaly developed during May and June, this eastward geostrophic flow persisted.

== See also ==
- Ekman layer – Net transport of surface water perpendicular to wind direction
- Ekman spiral – Net transport of surface water perpendicular to wind direction
- Ekman transport – Net transport of surface water perpendicular to wind direction
- Ekman number – Dimensionless ratio of viscous to Coriolis forces
- Vagn Walfrid Ekman – Swedish oceanographer (1874–1954)
