= Polarforschung =

- Discipline: Interdisciplinary, with emphasis on polar and high-mountain research
- Language: English, German
- Edited by: Dieter K. Fütterer, Bernhard Diekmann

Publication details
- Former name: Bulletin for the Association for the Promotion of Polar Research - Kiel
- History: 1931–present
- Publisher: Copernicus Publishing on behalf of the Deutsche Gesellschaft für Polarforschung and Alfred Wegener Institute for Polar and Marine Research (Germany)
- Frequency: Biannually
- Open access: Yes
- License: CC-BY 4.0

Standard abbreviations
- ISO 4: Polarforschung

Indexing
- CODEN: POLFA
- ISSN: 0032-2490

Links
- Journal homepage; Online access; Online archive

Polarforschung is a biannual peer-reviewed open-access academic journal published by Copernicus Publications on behalf of the German Society for Polar Research and the Alfred Wegener Institute for Polar and Marine Research. It was established in 1931, with articles appearing both in English and German. It covers a range of topics broadly related to the fields of polar, glaciological, and high-mountain research. Historically, reports from polar expeditions and reviews on polar topics were published as well. Though the journal originally published only on topics within the natural sciences, the current version of the journal includes contributions from an expanded range of polar and high-mountain research disciplines, including biology and ecology, geology and geophysics, geodesy and glaciology, permafrost, oceanography, climate and meteorology, history and social sciences, education, and outreach and knowledge transfer. The journal publishes scientific articles (without original results), review articles, reports for the polar community, teaching materials or concepts, and book reviews, alongside news and updates from the German Society for Polar Research, the Association of Polar Early Career Scientists Germany Board, and relevant conference reports. The journal no longer accepts manuscripts which show yet-unpublished or original data and results, and instead focuses on scientific articles with an overarching thematic focus.

== History ==
The journal was established in 1931 as the Bulletin for the Association for the Promotion of Polar Research - Kiel. The title page reported on the death of Alfred Wegener in Greenland. Until 1940, after which spending increased, eight-page issues were published biannually. In 1959 a scientific advisory board was formed. In the 1970s, the separation of news and communications from peer-reviewed original research articles resulted in its change from a newsletter to a scientific journal. Between 1986 and 2010, three issues were published annually. From 2011, the number of issues per year was again reduced to two. In 2018, discussions began with Copernicus Publications to collaborate on future issues of the journal.

== Abstracting and indexing ==
The journal is abstracted and indexed in Aquatic Sciences and Fisheries Abstracts, Chemical Abstracts Service, Scopus (with some interruptions; discontinued in 2021), and The Zoological Record.

== Honors ==
John H. Roscoe, an American scientist, named Polarforschung Glacier in East Antarctica in honor of the journal, following its discovery during Operation Highjump.
