= World Meteorological Day =

Observance on 23 March

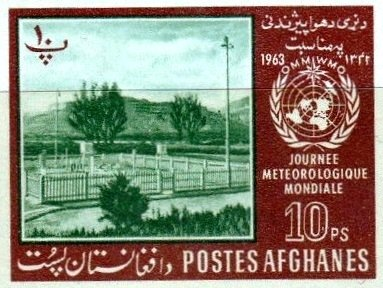
- Afghan stamps issued for the 1963 event
- Significance: support for environmental protection
- Begins: 23 March 1961
- Date: 23 March
- Next time: 23 March 2026
- Frequency: annual

World Meteorological Day was established in 1951 to commemorate the establishment of the World Meteorological Organization on 23 March 1950. This organization announces a slogan for World Meteorological Day every year, and this day is celebrated in all member countries.

== History and activities ==
The World Meteorological Organisation (WMO), an organization of the United Nations, was created on 23 March 1950 to replace the International Meteorological Organization. It began operations in 1951 to coordinate member nations in the fields of meteorology, operational hydrology, and Earth sciences for the security of their population. The first World Meteorological Day was held on 23 March 1961.

== Themes ==
Under are a few of the themes of recent years:

- Observing Today, Protecting Tomorrow (2026)
- Closing the Early Warning Gap Together (2025)
- At the Frontline of Climate Action (2024)
- The future of weather, climate and water across generations (2023)
- Early Warning and Early Action (2022)
- The Ocean, Our Climate and Weather (2021)
- Climate and Water (2020)
- The Sun, the Earth and the Weather (2019)
- Weather-ready, climate-smart (2018)
- Understanding clouds (2017)
- Hotter, drier, wetter - Face the future (2016)
- Climate knowledge for Climate Action (2015)
- Weather and Climate: Engaging youth (2014)
- Watching the weather to protect life and property: Celebrating 50 years of World Weather Watch (2013)
- Powering our future with weather, climate and water (2012)
- Climate for you (2011)
- 60 years of service for your safety and well-being (2010)
- Weather, climate and the air we breathe (2009)
- Observing our planet for a better future (2008)
- Polar meteorology: Understanding global impacts (2007)
- Preventing and mitigating natural disasters (2006)
- Weather, climate, water and sustainable development (2005)
- Weather, climate, water in the information age (2004)
- Our future climate (2003)
