= Ekman water bottle =

Sea water temperature sample device

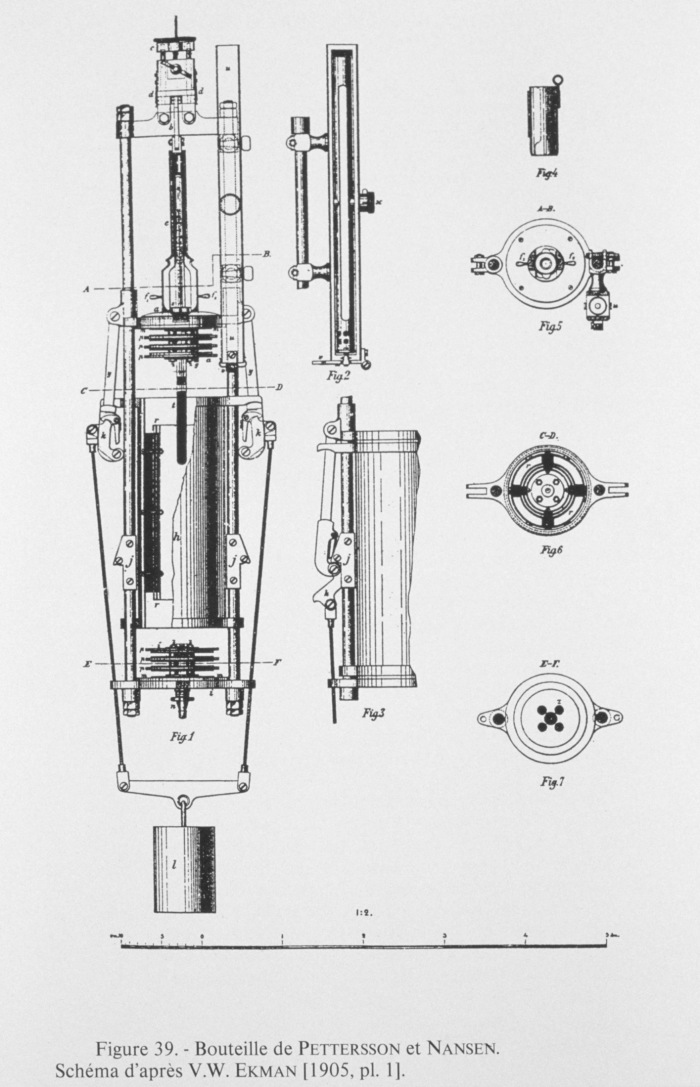
Ekman water bottle

The Ekman water bottle is a sea water temperature sample device. The cylinder is dropped at the desired depth, and the trap door below is opened to let water enter and then is closed tight. This can be repeated at different depths as each sample goes to a different chamber of the insulated bottle.

It was used for researching greater depths during research cruises of 1903 and 1904. The first instruments made, however, were delicate; after being used for some time, the brass rods which press the lids towards both ends of the cylinder and close the water-bottle, became bent. For this reason the instruments had to be frequently tested and repaired. As the bottles are made now they are more easily handled.

== See also ==
- Oceanography
- Vagn Walfrid Ekman
- Ekman spiral
- Ekman current meter
- Nansen bottle
