= Ekman current meter =

Mechanical flowmeter invented by Vagn Walfrid Ekman, a Swedish oceanographer, in 1903

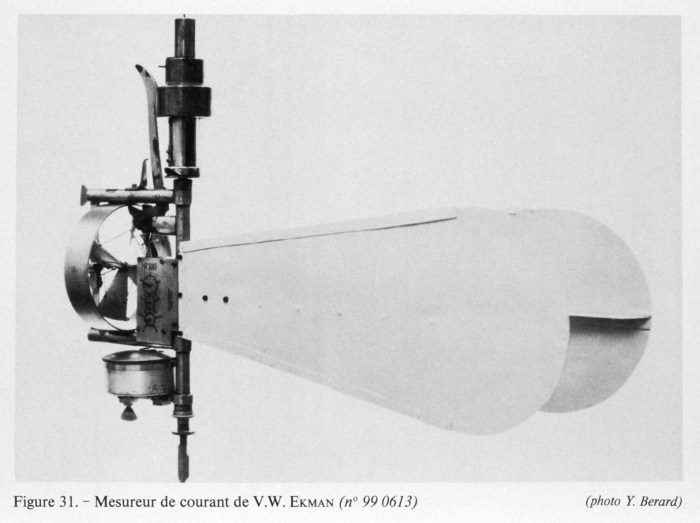
Ekman current meter

The Ekman current meter is a mechanical flowmeter invented by Vagn Walfrid Ekman, a Swedish oceanographer, in 1903. It comprises a propeller with a mechanism to record the number of revolutions, a compass and a recorder with which to record the direction, and a vane that orients the instrument so the propeller faces the current. It is mounted on a free-swinging vertical axis suspended from a wire and has a weight attached below.

The balanced propeller, with four to eight blades, rotates inside a protective ring. The position of a lever controls the propeller. In the down position the propeller is stopped and the instrument is lowered, after reaching the desired depth a weight called a messenger is dropped to move the lever into the middle position which allows the propeller to turn freely. When the measurement has been taken another weight is dropped to push the lever to its highest position at which the propeller is again stopped.

The propeller revolutions are counted via a simple mechanism that gears down the revolutions and counts them on an indicator dial. The direction is indicated by a device connected to the directional vane that drops a small metal ball about every 100 revolutions. The ball falls into one of thirty-six compartments in the bottom of the compass box that indicate direction in increments of 10 degrees. If the direction changes while the measurement is being performed the balls will drop into separate compartments and a weighted mean is taken to determine the average current direction.

This is a simple and reliable instrument whose main disadvantage is that is must be hauled up to be read and reset after each measurement. Ekman solved this problem and designed a repeating current meter which could take up to forty-seven measurements before needing to be hauled up and reset. This device used a more complicated system of dropping small numbered metal balls at regular intervals to record the separate measurements.

== See also ==
- Oceanic current
- Ekman spiral
- Ekman water bottle
