= Hedda Ekman =

Swedish writer and photographer

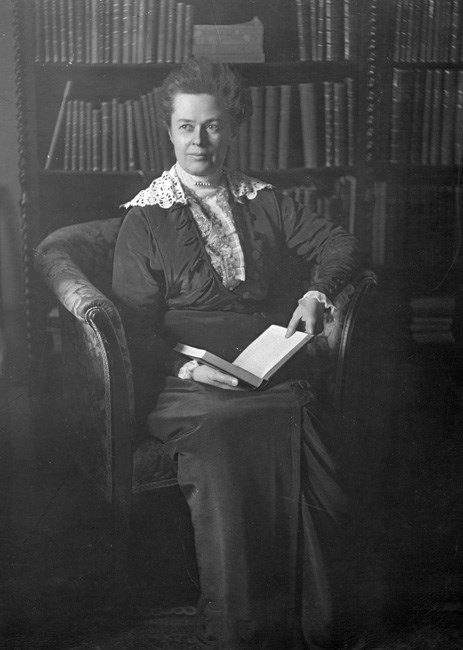
- Born: Hedvig Sofia Richert; 3 July 1860; Gothenburg, Sweden
- Died: 22 January 1929 (aged 68); Gothenburg, Sweden
- Occupations: Writer, photographer
- Spouse: Johan Emilson Ekman (m. 1881; died 1919)
- Children: 6
- Writing career
- Genre: family history

Hedvig (Hedda) Sofia Ekman née Richert (3 July 1860 – 22 January 1929) was a Swedish writer and photographer. Married to the Swedish businessman and politician Johan Emilson Ekman, she is remembered for her detailed four-volume chronicle of the Ekman family depicting life at the turn of the 20th century. Hedda Ekman is also recognized as a highly competent photographer.

== Biography ==
Born in Gothenburg on 3 July 1860, Hedvig Sofia Richert was the daughter of Colonel Josel Gabriel Richert (1828–1895) and his wife Hedvig Magdalena née Netzel. In 1881, she married the businessman Johan Emilson Ekman (1854–1919) with whom she had six children.

After her marriage, she embarked on a detailed chronicle of the Ekman family titled Familjen Johan Ekmans Krönika published in four parts (1914, 1918–1923 and posthumously in 1979) She also wrote an account of her childhood among the prosperous citizens of Gothenburg which is stored in the city's National Resource Library for Gender Studies.

As a photographer, in additional to portraits of the Ekman family, she took images of the countryside, fisherman and fishing boats. From 1894, she used tripods and glass plates to capture scenes of the Gothenburg archipelago as she and her family spent their summer in a villa on the island of Styrsö. She used many of her photographs to create albums tracing the lives of members of the Swedish upper class as well as for her chronicles of the Ekman family. She also photographed in London and in the English countryside.

Hedvig Sofia Ekman died in Gothenburg on 22 January 1929.
