= Polar meteorology =

Term

Polar meteorology is the study of the atmosphere of Earth's polar regions. Surface temperature inversion is typical of polar environments and leads to the katabatic wind phenomenon. The vertical temperature structure of polar environments tends to be more complex than in mid-latitude or tropical climates.

== History ==
=== Beginnings ===
The collection of polar meteorology data started in 1893 with Fridtjof Nansen during his North Pole expedition. One of the goals of the expedition was to make detailed meteorological and early oceanographic measurements. The measurements made from Nansen’s ship, which was named Fram, were used by Vagn Walfrid Ekman to develop the theory of the turning of surface flow with friction (the Ekman spiral).

=== Cold War ===
The Cold War acted as a catalyst for progress in polar meteorology. Balloon instruments along the northern borders of the US and Canada were used for atmospheric profiling. North America’s air defenses often used instruments carried on balloons to profile the Arctic. Nuclear submarines, which the United States used as a defense mechanism, were equipped with upward looking sonar. The data were later declassified and between 1958-1979 became the baseline for assessing the thinning of ice from the 1980s to the present day. Russia also contributed highly accurate data between 1937 and 1991.

=== Present day ===
Today, submarine mapping and measurements have been drastically reduced. One classic way to measuring ice thickness is to drill a hole in the ice and analyze the ice obtained. There are also many more complex methods and devices dedicated to measuring and keeping track of weather conditions in polar areas. These include ice mass balance buoys, upward looking sonar from under-ice buoys, and satellites. Global warming has increased interest in polar meteorology. This is because most of Earth's snow and ice are in polar regions, and these areas are expected to be the most affected by the snow/ice-surface albedo feedback effect. Therefore, if increased atmospheric carbon dioxide concentration causes global warming, then polar regions should warm faster than other locations on Earth.

== Topics of interest ==
=== Atmosphere sea ice/ocean interaction ===
Interaction between the atmosphere, ice and ocean is confined to the atmospheric boundary layer, which is mainly influenced by surface characteristics. In polar regions, these are sea ice roughness and sea ice concentration, which greatly influence surface temperature distribution. Wind speed and direction, the temperature of the air, and the location of the wind contact are other factors. Both sea ice and wind have great impact on the atmospheric boundary layer, which is often used to measure conditions in polar areas.

=== Polar clouds and precipitation ===
The atmospheric portion of the hydrological cycle in polar regions plays an important role in that:

- the balance of polar ice masses is inseparably linked to precipitation,
- clouds modify the radiation transfer,
- the release of latent heat modifies the temperature of the air, hence circulations.

=== Carbon dioxide and methane ===
Carbon dioxide (CO_{2}) is of particular interest in polar meteorology because it affects the melting of sea ice. Human activity releases carbon dioxide into the atmosphere from burning oil, coal and natural gas. A dozen kilograms of Arctic sea ice disappears for every kilogram of carbon dioxide released. This highlights the heating power of carbon dioxide, which pumps 100,000 times more energy into our climate than was given off when the oil, coal or natural gas was burned. White Arctic ice, currently at its lowest level in recent history, is causing more absorption. Peter Wadhams of Cambridge University, in a 2012 BBC article, calculated that this absorption of the sun's rays is having an effect "the equivalent of about 20 years of additional CO_{2} being added by man". He said that the Arctic ice cap is "heading for oblivion".

Methane, a potent greenhouse gas, introduces a significant positive feedback as global warming leads to the retreat of vast areas of continuous and discontinuous permafrost in the northern hemisphere. As permafrost retreats, more areas become emitters of methane. Estimations of the methane emissions from northern swamps vary strongly due to

- the extensive variability of methane emission between and within different swamp areas
- the very limited knowledge of these fluxes for various types of soils, and
- the lack of representative data for vast areas like the enormous swamps, e.g., in Siberia.

Recent advances now allow sensors to directly measure turbulent methane fluxes from naturally emitting surfaces. A fast response methane sensor can also be installed in research aircraft, like the Polar 5 airplane of the Alfred Wegener Institute.
