= Jeannette Eckman =

American historian from Delaware

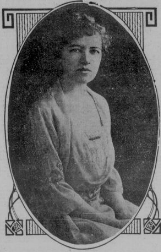
- Born: March 29, 1882; Wilmington, Delaware
- Died: April 7, 1972 (aged 90); Wilmington, Delaware

Laura Jeannette Eckman (March 29, 1882 – April 7, 1972) was an American historian and author known for her work on the Delaware Federal Writers' Project.

Eckman was born in Wilmington, Delaware in 1882, the daughter of Aument and Margaret Eckman. She graduated from Wellesley College in 1905. After college she taught German at a local high school until World War I when she started working for women's suffrage. She was appointed assistant secretary to the Republican State Committee in 1920, the first woman with an executive position in the state's Republican party. She worked for Senator T. Coleman du Pont during his two terms in office. From this position she spoke to many women's groups about the importance of getting women out to the polls.

Eckman was a charter member of the Delaware Swedish Colonial Society as well as a member of the Archaeological Society of Delaware. She served as vice-chairman of the Delaware branch of the Women's Organization for National Prohibition Reform, and attended the National Conference on Child Labor in 1917 as the Delaware representative.

== Writing ==
Eckman was a self-taught historian who researched Delaware history. In 1938, she received an honorary award from the Queen of the Netherlands for her part in the 300-year anniversary celebration of the Dutch settlement of New Castle, a settlement which she later wrote a book about through her work with the Works Progress Administration. In 1941, she became director of the Delaware Federal Writers' Project and the Federal Arts Project. While her focus was mostly on writing, she did work with notable Delaware artists including Edward Loper. She edited three editions of the Delaware State Guide (1938, 1947 and 1955) as well as the New Castle Guide (1936, 1937 and 1950). The New Castle guide, called New Castle on the Delaware was one of the first Federal Writers' Project books, published in 1936 with Eckman as editor. The 1950 edition was heavily edited and expanded by Eckman.

She was appointed director and historian of the New Castle Tercentenary Celebration in 1950. She published Crane Hook on the Delaware, 1667-1669 in 1957, describing the years when Crane Hook Church, one of the first churches in the region, served a population from New Castle, Delaware to Tinicum, Pennsylvania. The book Delaware: A Guide to the First State was the tenth book in the American Guide Series, being released along with the Swedish-American Delaware Tercentenary Celebration. Eckman edited three versions of that book, along with Anthony Higgins and William H. Conner.

In 1963 Eckman edited historical research done by Betty Macdonald as part of her newspaper series and published Historic Landmarks of Delaware and the Eastern Shore; it won first place in the Women's Club of the Year Competition.

== Death and legacy ==
Eckman died in 1972. She was inducted into the Delaware Hall of Fame in 2010. Her papers are held by the Smithsonian Archives of American Art.

== Bibliography ==
- A Century of Fine Cloth, 1831-1931 (1931)
- New Castle on the Delaware (1936)
- Delaware, A Guide to the First State (1938)
- The Kinkheads of Delaware as Pioneers in Minnesota (1949)
- Crane Hook on the Delaware (1957)
- Historic Landmarks of Delaware and the Eastern Shore (1963)
