= Modified pressure =

Concept in fluid dynamics

Some systems in fluid dynamics involve a fluid being subject to conservative body forces. Since a conservative body force is the gradient of some potential function, it has the same effect as a gradient in fluid pressure. It is often convenient to define a modified pressure equal to the true fluid pressure plus the potential.

Examples of conservative body forces include gravity and the centrifugal force in a rotating reference frame.

== See also ==
- Reduced gravity
