= Sheldon V. Ekman =

American judge (1920–1982)

Sheldon Victor Ekman (March 12, 1920 – January 21, 1982) was an American attorney and tax law expert who served as a judge of the United States Tax Court from 1980 to 1982.

Born in Manchester, New Hampshire, Ekman received an A.B. from Harvard College in 1939, followed by a J.D. from Harvard Law School in 1942. He served in the United States Navy in World War II, from 1942 to 1945, attaining the rank of lieutenant.

He was a trial attorney in the Office of Chief Counsel, Internal Revenue Service, in New York City, from 1945 to 1950. He then enterered private practice as a tax principal with S. D. Leidesdorf & Co., also in New York, from 1950 to 1969. He was then a partner with Reavis & McGrath in New York from 1969 to 1980, also becoming an adjunct professor of law and taxation at New York University in 1979.

He also taught classes at various points for Ohio State University, Rutgers University, the University of Miami, New York Law School, and The New School for Social Research. Ekman "wrote extensively on his specialties and his research was published in various proceedings".

On June 2, 1980, President Jimmy Carter appointed Ekman to the U.S. Tax Court for a 15-year term, to succeed Judge William M. Drennen.

Ekman married Judith Saturen in 1943, with whom he had a son Richard H., and a daughter, Joanna K. They resided in Westport, Connecticut for many years. Two years after his appointment to the Tax Court, Ekman died from a heart attack at the age of 61, while on judicial assignment in Philadelphia.
