= Elisabeth Ekman =

Swedish botanist

Hedda Maria Emerence Adelaïde Elisabeth Ekman, née Åkerhielm (18 December 1862 – 25 May 1936), credited as Elisabeth Ekman, was a Swedish botanist, noted for her study of the genus Draba. She became a prominent researcher despite having no real academic background education or degree.

== Life ==
Ekman was born Hedda Maria Emerence Adelaïde Elisabeth Åkerhielm on 18 December 1862 in Axbergs församling, Örebro län. Her father was court marshal Baron Christian Wilhelm Åkerhielm of Margaretelund. She is credited as Elisabeth Ekman.

Ekman had an early interest in plants, and was educated at home, and through attending lectures in botany and genetics. She had tutoring in Latin, and also took lessons in drawing and painting. Ekman married and three sons, and after her children had grown up and her husband died in 1897, she began to spend more time on botanical work. She worked on Salix species (willow), and then moved on to study of the genus Draba (whitlow grasses), on which she became expert. She was especially interested in the Arctic and Alpine forms of the plant. In 1909 Ekman found a new plant near Knudshö near Kongsvold on the Dovre River, which was closely related to Stellaria longipes. She did not publish the find until 1926.

Ekman travelled to a number of places on to pursue her studies, including the island of Mäkisalo in Ladoga in 1914, the Austrian Alps in 1921, Greenland in 1923 and Ben Lawers in Scotland in 1930.

She became a prominent researcher despite having no real academic background education or degree. She distinguished and described several new species and forms of the Draba genus, and described new species of the genus Antennaria, as well as carrying out identifications for other researchers.

Ekman died on 25 May 1936 in Hedvig Eleonora Parish, Stockholms län. Her collections are held by the Botanical Department of the National Museum.

== Written works ==
- Ekman, Elisabeth (1917). "Zur Kenntnis Der Nordischen Hochgebirgs-Drabae". Kungl. Svenska Vetenskapsakademiens Handlingar (in Swedish). 57 (3): 1–77.
