= Vagn Walfrid Ekman =

Swedish oceanographer (1874–1954)

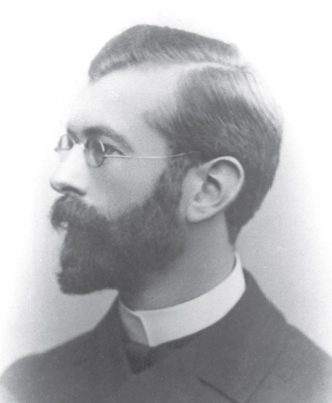
- Vagn Walfrid Ekman
- Born: 3 May 1874; Stockholm, Sweden
- Died: 9 March 1954 (aged 79); Gostad
- Education: Uppsala University
- Known for: Geophysical fluid dynamics Ocean dynamics Physical oceanography Polar meteorology Ekman current meter Ekman layer Ekman number Ekman spiral Ekman transport Ekman velocity Ekman water bottle
- Awards: Alexander Agassiz Medal (1928); Vega Medal (1939)
- Scientific career
- Fields: Geophysics; Oceanography

Vagn Walfrid Ekman (3 May 1874 – 9 March 1954) was a Swedish oceanographer.

Born in Stockholm to Fredrik Laurentz Ekman, himself an oceanographer, he became committed to oceanography while studying physics at the University of Uppsala and, in particular, on hearing Vilhelm Bjerknes lecture on fluid dynamics.

During the expedition of the Fram, Fridtjof Nansen had observed that icebergs tend to drift not in the direction of the prevailing wind but at an angle of 20° to 40° to the right. Bjerknes invited Ekman, still a student, to investigate the problem. Later, in 1905, Ekman published his theory of the Ekman spiral which explains the phenomenon in terms of the balance between frictional effects in the ocean and the Coriolis force, which arises from moving objects in a rotating environment, like planetary rotation.

On completing his doctorate in Uppsala in 1902, Ekman joined the International Laboratory for Oceanographic Research, Oslo where he worked for seven years, not only extending his theoretical work but also developing experimental techniques and instruments such as the Ekman current meter and Ekman water bottle.

From 1910 to 1939 he continued his theoretical and experimental work at the University of Lund, where he was professor of mechanics and mathematical physics. He was elected a member of the Royal Swedish Academy of Sciences in 1935.

A gifted amateur bass singer, pianist, and composer, he continued working right up to his death in Gostad, near Stockaryd, Sweden.

== See also ==
- Ekman layer – Net transport of surface water perpendicular to wind direction
- Ekman number – Dimensionless ratio of viscous to Coriolis forces
- Ekman spiral – Net transport of surface water perpendicular to wind direction
- Ekman transport – Net transport of surface water perpendicular to wind direction
- Ekman velocity – Formula for wind induced water current velocity
