= Eckmann =

Eckmann is a surname of German origin. It is composed of the German words "eck(e)" (meaning "corner") and "mann" (meaning "man"). It may refer to:

- Alyson Eckmann (born 1990), American television and radio host
- Beno Eckmann (1917–2008), Swiss mathematician
- Chris M. Eckmann (1874–1937), Mayor of Anchorage, Alaska from 1926 to 1927
- Jean-Pierre Eckmann (born 1944), mathematical physicist, son of Beno Eckmann
- Max Eckmann (1851–1931), New York assemblyman
- Otto Eckmann (1865–1902), German painter and graphic artist

== See also ==
- Eckmann–Hilton argument, mathematical concept
- Eckmann–Hilton duality, mathematical concept
