= Ekman number =

Dimensionless ratio of viscous to Coriolis forces

The Ekman number (Ek) is a dimensionless number used in fluid dynamics to describe the ratio of viscous forces to Coriolis forces. It is frequently used in describing geophysical phenomena in the oceans and atmosphere in order to characterise the ratio of viscous forces to the Coriolis forces arising from planetary rotation. It is named after the Swedish oceanographer Vagn Walfrid Ekman.

When the Ekman number is small, disturbances are able to propagate before decaying owing to low frictional effects. The Ekman number also describes the order of magnitude for the thickness of an Ekman layer, a boundary layer in which viscous diffusion is balanced by Coriolis effects, rather than the usual convective inertia.

== Definitions ==
It is defined as:

$$\mathrm{Ek}=\frac{\nu}{2D^2\Omega\sin\varphi}$$

- where D is a characteristic (usually vertical) length scale of a phenomenon; ν, the kinematic eddy viscosity; Ω, the angular velocity of planetary rotation; and φ, the latitude. The term 2 Ω sin φ is the Coriolis frequency. It is given in terms of the kinematic viscosity, ν; the angular velocity, Ω; and a characteristic length scale, L.

There do appear to be some differing conventions in the literature.

Tritton gives:

$$\mathrm{Ek} = \frac{\nu}{\Omega L^2}.$$

In contrast, the NRL Plasma Formulary gives:

$$\mathrm{Ek} = \sqrt{\frac{\nu}{2\Omega L^2}} = \sqrt{\frac{\mathrm{Ro}}{\mathrm{Re}}}.$$

where Ro is the Rossby number and Re is the Reynolds number.

These equations can generally not be used in oceanography. An estimation of the viscous terms of Navier-Stokes equation (with eventually the Eddy Viscosity) and of the Coriolis terms needs to be done.
