= Tide =

Change in sea level due to gravity

Simplified schematic of only the lunar portion of Earth's tides, showing (exaggerated) high tides at the sublunar point and its antipode for the hypothetical case of an ocean of constant depth without land, and on the assumption that Earth is not rotating; otherwise there is a lag angle. Solar tides not shown.

Tide coming in, video stops about 1 1/2 hours before high tide

Tide coming in

Tides are the periodic rise and fall of sea level resulting from the differential gravitational forces exerted primarily by the Moon and the Sun, combined with inertial effects associated with the Earth–Moon system’s orbital motion and the Earth's rotation.

While these astronomical forcings generate the fundamental tidal potential, actual observed tides are strongly modified by terrestrial factors, including the geometry of ocean basins, continental boundaries, bathymetry, the coriolis effect, frictional dissipation within shallow seas and the tidal resonance of coastlines.

Tides vary on timescales ranging from hours to years due to a number of factors, which determine the lunitidal interval. To make accurate records, tide gauges at fixed stations measure water level over time. Gauges ignore variations caused by waves with periods shorter than minutes. These data are compared to the reference (or datum) level usually called mean sea level.

While tides are usually the largest source of short-term sea-level fluctuations, sea levels are also subject to change from thermal expansion, wind, and barometric pressure changes, resulting in storm surges, especially in shallow seas and near coasts.

Tidal phenomena are not limited to the oceans, but can occur in other systems whenever a gravitational field that varies in time and space is present. For example, the shape of the solid part of the Earth is affected slightly by Earth tide, though this is not as easily seen as the water tidal movements.

== Characteristics ==
Ocean tides are cyclic, rising and falling approximately twice a day. Four stages in the tidal cycle are named:

- The water stops falling, reaching a local minimum called low tide.
- Sea level rises over several hours, covering the intertidal zone; flooding.
- The water stops rising, reaching a local maximum called high tide.
- Sea level falls over several hours, revealing the intertidal zone; ebbing.

Oscillating currents produced by tides are known as tidal streams or tidal currents. The moment that the tidal current ceases is called slack water or slack tide. The tide then reverses direction and is said to be turning. Slack water usually occurs near high water and low water, but there are locations where the moments of slack tide differ significantly from those of high and low water.

=== Tidal regimes ===
Many shorelines experience semi-diurnal tides — two high and two low tides each day. Other locations have a diurnal tide — one high and low tide each day. A mixed tide — two uneven magnitude tides a day — is a third common regime. In semi-diurnal tides, the two high waters on a given day are typically not of the same height, their difference being the daily inequality. (Note: These are the higher high water and the lower high water in tide tables. Similarly, the two low waters each day are the higher low water and the lower low water.) (Note: The daily inequality is not consistent and is generally small when the Moon is over the Equator.) (Note: Tide tables usually list mean lower low water (mllw, the 19 year average of lower low waters), mean higher low water (mhlw), mean lower high water (mlhw), mean higher high water (mhhw), as well as perigean tides. These are mean values in the sense that they derive from mean data.)

Types of tidal regimes (See below for coastal map)

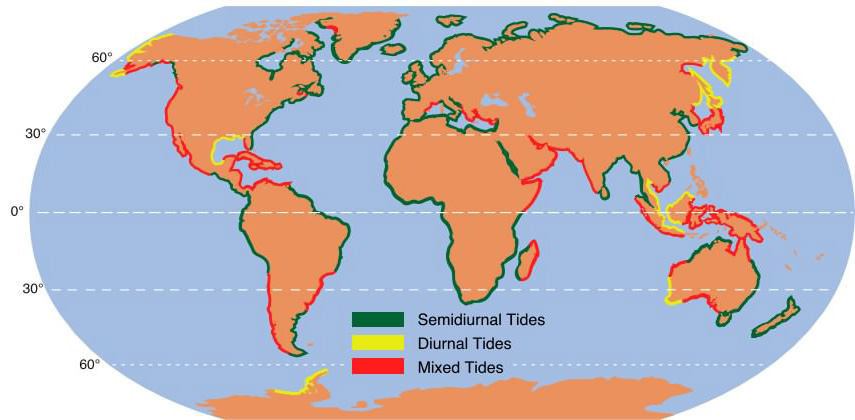
The same tidal forcing has different results depending on many factors, including coast orientation, continental shelf margin, water body dimensions.

=== Range variation: springs and neaps ===
The types of tides

The semi-diurnal range (the difference in height between high and low waters over about half a day) varies in a two-week cycle. Approximately twice a month, around new moon and full moon when the Sun, Moon, and Earth form a line (a configuration known as a syzygy), the tidal force due to the Sun reinforces that due to the Moon. The tide's range is then at its maximum; this is called the spring tide. It is not named after the season, but, like that word, derives from the meaning "jump, burst forth, rise", as in a natural spring. Spring tides are sometimes referred to as syzygy tides.

When the Moon is at first quarter or third quarter, the Sun and Moon are separated by 90° when viewed from the Earth (in quadrature), and the solar tidal force partially cancels the Moon's tidal force. At these points in the lunar cycle, the tide's range is at its minimum; this is called the neap tide, or neaps. "Neap" is an Anglo-Saxon word meaning "without the power". Neap tides are sometimes referred to as quadrature tides.

Spring tides result in high waters that are higher than average, low waters that are lower than average, "slack water" time that is shorter than average, and stronger tidal currents than average. Neaps result in milder tidal conditions. There is about a seven-day interval between springs and neaps.

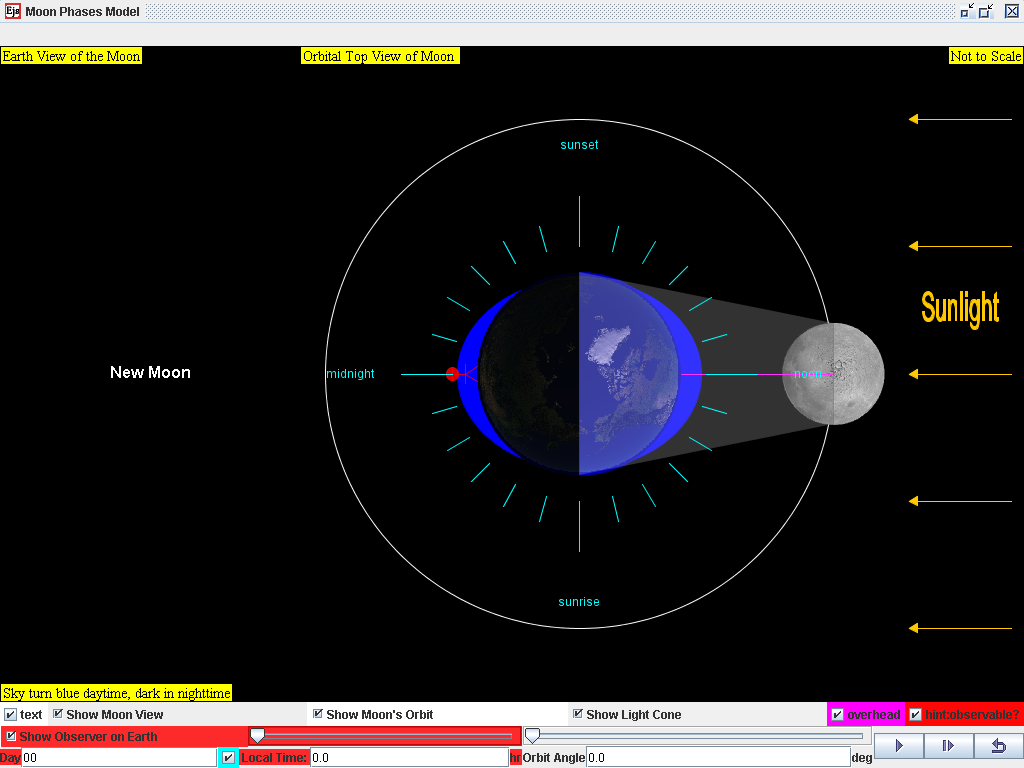
Spring tide: Sun and Moon on the same side (0°)

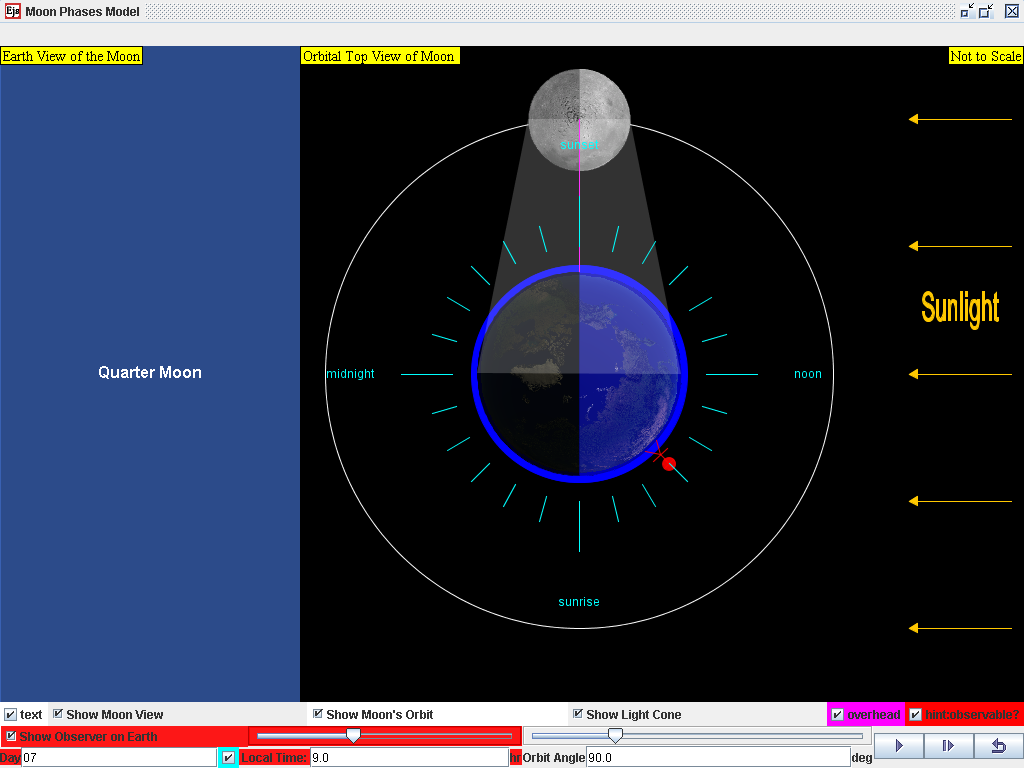
Neap tide: Sun and Moon at 90°

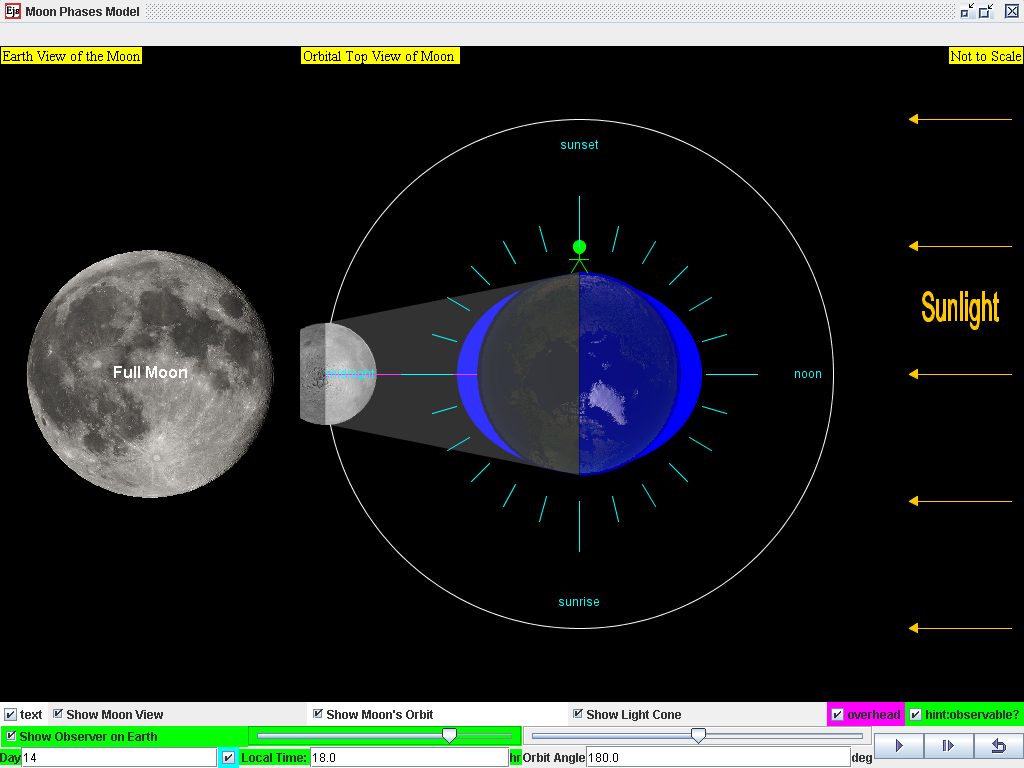
Spring tide: Sun and Moon at opposite sides (180°)

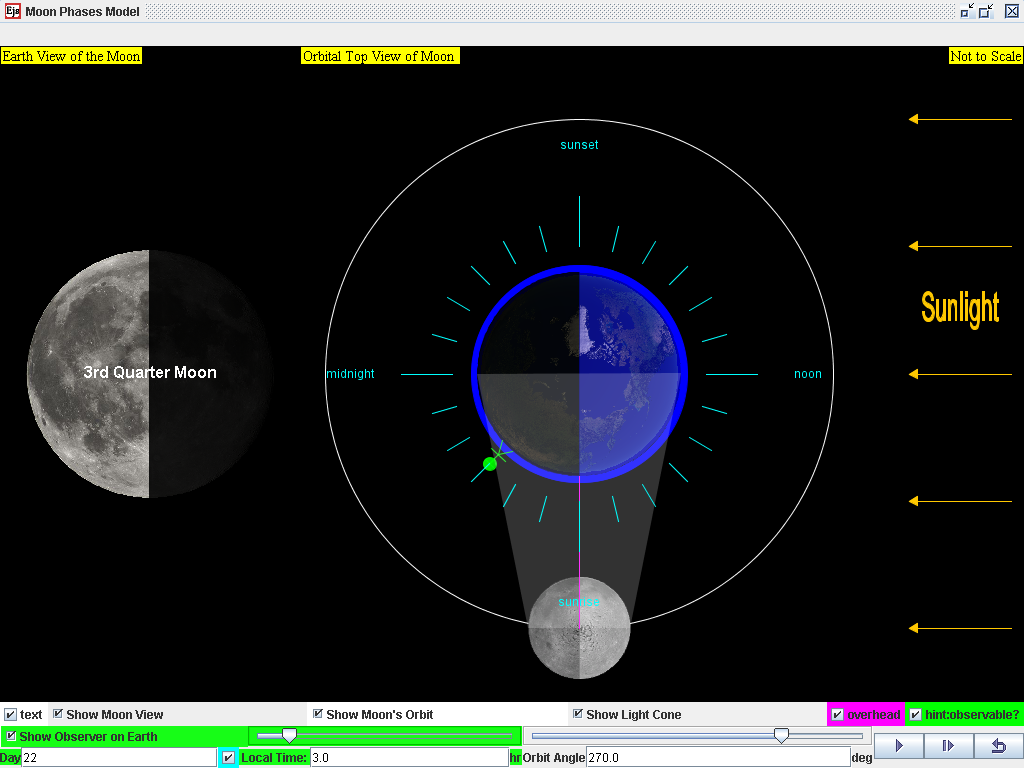
Neap tide: Sun and Moon at 270°

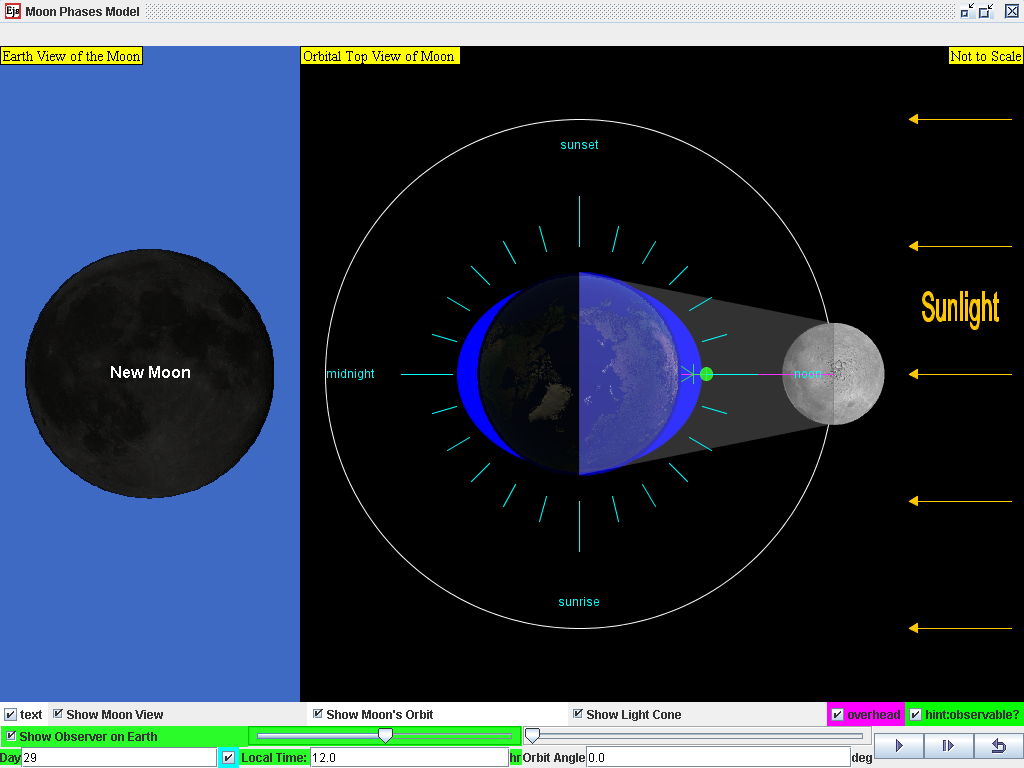
Spring tide: Sun and Moon at the same side (cycle restarts)

=== Reference levels ===
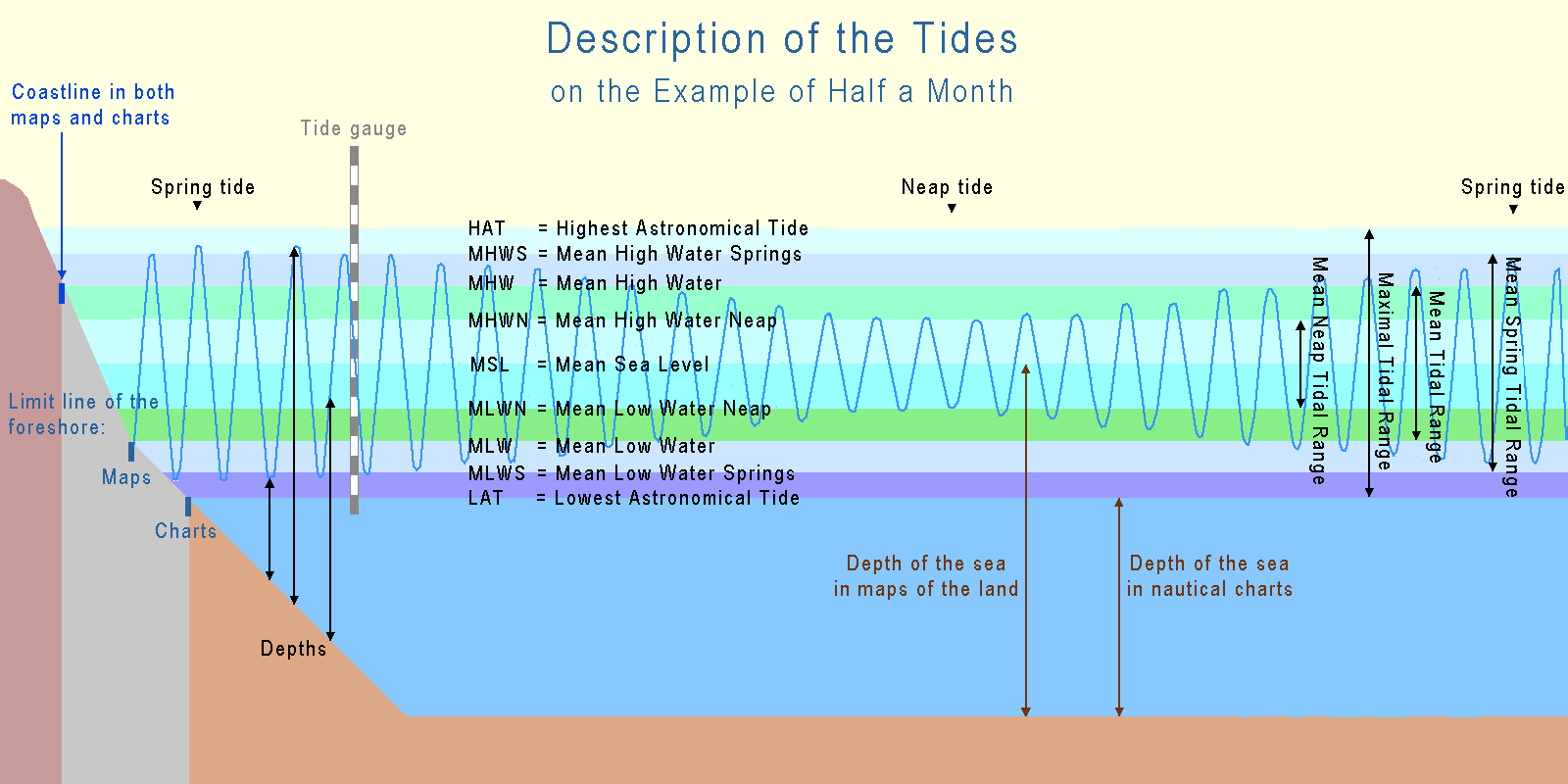
Illustration by the course of half a month

The following reference tide levels can be defined, from the highest level to the lowest:

- Highest astronomical tide (HAT) – The highest tide that can be predicted to occur. Note that meteorological conditions may add extra height to the HAT.
- Mean high water springs (MHWS) – The average of the two high tides on the days of spring tides.
- Mean high water neaps (MHWN) – The average of the two high tides on the days of neap tides.
- Mean sea level (MSL) – This is the average sea level. The MSL is constant for any location over a long period.
- Mean low water neaps (MLWN) – The average of the two low tides on the days of neap tides.
- Mean low water springs (MLWS) – The average of the two low tides on the days of spring tides.
- Lowest astronomical tide (LAT) – The lowest tide which can be predicted to occur.

== Tidal constituents ==
Tidal constituents are the net result of multiple influences impacting tidal changes over certain periods of time. Primary constituents include the Earth's rotation, the position of the Moon and Sun relative to the Earth, the Moon's altitude (elevation) above the Earth's Equator, and bathymetry. Variations with periods of less than half a day are called harmonic constituents. Conversely, cycles of days, months, or years are referred to as long period constituents.

Tidal forces act on the entire Earth system. In Earth's crust, these forces produce periodic vertical displacements of centimeters, a phenomenon known as Earth tide. In the atmosphere, gravitational forcing by the Moon and Sun, together with solar heating, generates global-scale oscillations in pressure, density, and wind known as Atmospheric tide. Whereas Earth tides involve elastic deformation, atmospheric tides are observed primarily as oscillations in pressure gradients and wind patterns.

=== Principal lunar semi-diurnal constituent ===
Global surface elevation of M2 ocean tide (NASA)

In most locations, the largest constituent is the principal lunar semi-diurnal, also known as the M2 tidal constituent or M_{2} tidal constituent. Its period is about 12 hours and 25.2 minutes, exactly half a tidal lunar day, which is the average time separating one lunar zenith from the next, and thus is the time required for the Earth to rotate once relative to the Moon. Simple tide clocks track this constituent. The lunar day is longer than the solar day because the Moon orbits in the same direction as the Earth spins.

The Moon orbits the Earth in the same direction as the Earth rotates on its axis, so it takes slightly more than a day—about 24 hours and 50 minutes—for the Moon to return to the same location in the sky. During this time, it has passed overhead (culmination) once and underfoot once (at an hour angle of 00:00 and 12:00 respectively), so, in many places, the period of strongest tidal forcing is the above-mentioned, about 12 hours and 25 minutes. The moment of highest tide is not necessarily when the Moon is nearest to the zenith or nadir, but the period of the forcing still determines the time between high tides.

Because the gravitational field created by the Moon weakens with distance from the Moon, it exerts a slightly stronger than average force on the side of the Earth facing the Moon, and a slightly weaker force on the opposite side. The Moon thus tends to "stretch" the Earth slightly along the line connecting the two bodies. The solid Earth deforms a bit, but ocean water, being fluid, is free to move much more in response to the tidal force, particularly horizontally (see equilibrium tide).

As the Earth rotates, the magnitude and direction of the tidal force at any particular point on the Earth's surface change constantly; although the ocean never reaches equilibrium—there is never time for the fluid to "catch up" to the state it would eventually reach if the tidal force were constant—the changing tidal force nonetheless causes rhythmic changes in sea surface height.

When there are two high tides each day with different heights (and two low tides also of different heights), the pattern is called a mixed semi-diurnal tide.

=== Lunar distance ===
The changing distance separating the Moon and Earth also affects tide heights. When the Moon is closest, at perigee, the range increases, and when it is at apogee, the range shrinks. Six or eight times a year, perigee coincides with either a new or full moon causing perigean spring tides with the largest tidal range. The difference between the height of a tide at perigean spring tide and the spring tide when the moon is at apogee depends on location but can be as large as a foot higher.

=== Other constituents ===
About 62 constituents are of sufficient size to be considered useful in marine tide prediction, these include solar gravitational effects, the obliquity (tilt) of the Earth's Equator and rotational axis, the inclination of the plane of the lunar orbit and the elliptical shape of the Earth's orbit of the Sun.

Shallow-water constituents include overtides, which are higher harmonics of a single dominant tidal frequency, and compound tides, which result from interactions between the primary lunar and solar constituents. Although typically smaller in amplitude than the fundamental tidal potential, these constituents modify asymmetries between rising and falling tides in estuaries and continental shelf regions.

=== Phase and amplitude ===
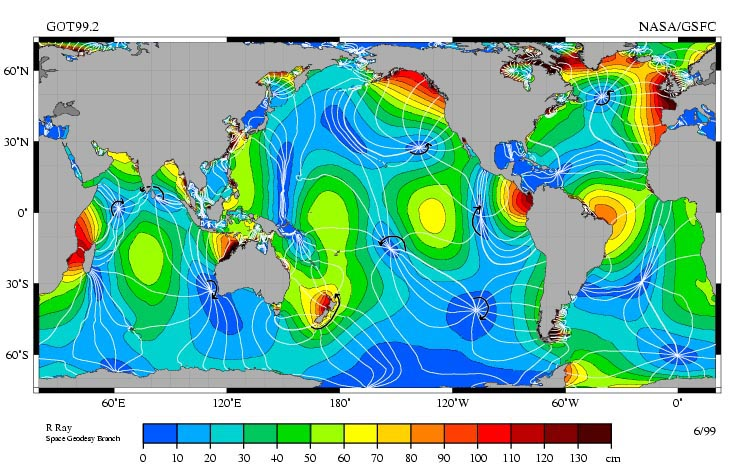
M_{2} tidal constituent. Red is most extreme (highest highs, lowest lows), with blues being least extreme. White cotidal lines converge in blue areas indicating little or no tide. Around these convergences, called amphidromic points, curved arrows show the direction of the tides, each indicating a synchronized 6-hour period. Tidal ranges generally increase with increasing distance from amphidromic points. Tide waves move around these points, generally counterclockwise in the N. Hemisphere and clockwise in the S. Hemisphere

Because the M_{2} tidal constituent dominates in most locations, the stage or phase of a tide, denoted by the time in hours after high water, is a useful concept. Tidal stage is also measured in degrees, with 360° per tidal cycle. Lines of constant tidal phase are called cotidal lines, which are analogous to contour lines of constant altitude on topographical maps, and when plotted form a cotidal map or cotidal chart. High water is reached simultaneously along the cotidal lines extending from the coast out into the ocean, and cotidal lines (and hence tidal phases) advance along the coast. Semi-diurnal and long phase constituents are measured from high water, diurnal from maximum flood tide. This and the discussion that follows is precisely true only for a single tidal constituent.

For an ocean in the shape of a circular basin enclosed by a coastline, the cotidal lines point radially inward and must eventually meet at a common point, the amphidromic point. The amphidromic point is at once cotidal with high and low waters, which is satisfied by zero tidal motion. (The rare exception occurs when the tide encircles an island, as it does around New Zealand, Iceland and Madagascar.) Tidal motion generally lessens moving away from continental coasts, so that crossing the cotidal lines are contours of constant amplitude (half the distance between high and low water) which decrease to zero at the amphidromic point. For a semi-diurnal tide the amphidromic point can be thought of roughly like the center of a clock face, with the hour hand pointing in the direction of the high water cotidal line, which is directly opposite the low water cotidal line. High water rotates about the amphidromic point once every 12 hours in the direction of rising cotidal lines, and away from ebbing cotidal lines. This rotation, caused by the Coriolis effect, is generally clockwise in the southern hemisphere and counterclockwise in the northern hemisphere. The difference of cotidal phase from the phase of a reference tide is the epoch. The reference tide is the hypothetical constituent "equilibrium tide" on a landless Earth measured at 0° longitude, the Greenwich meridian.

In the North Atlantic, the cotidal lines associated with the amphidromic system describe the propagation of the semidiurnal tidal wave, producing a general north-to-south progression of high water along the eastern coast of North America. The tidal regime changes near Cape Hatteras, where the Mid-Atlantic Bight meets the South Atlantic Bight, where regional tides are dominated by interactions between tidal constituents, seasonal stratification and Gulf Stream influences.

== History ==
=== History of tidal theory ===
In pre-scientific traditions, tides were attributed to mythological or animistic causes, with Indian and East Asian literature describing the sea as breathing or pulsing like a living being, other accounts invoked the activity of a supernatural sea power to explain the periodic rise and fall of the waters.

Investigation into tidal physics was important in the early development of celestial mechanics, with the existence of two daily tides being explained by the Moon's gravity. Later, the daily tides were explained more precisely by the interaction of the Moon's and the Sun's gravity.

Seleucus of Seleucia theorized around 150 BC that tides were caused by the Moon. The influence of the Moon on bodies of water was also mentioned in Ptolemy's Tetrabiblos. (Note: "The moon, too, as the heavenly body nearest the earth, bestows her effluence most abundantly upon mundane things, for most of them, animate or inanimate, are sympathetic to her and change in company with her; the rivers increase and diminish their streams with her light, the seas turn their own tides with her rising and setting, ... ")

In De temporum ratione (The Reckoning of Time) of 725 Bede linked semidurnal tides and the phenomenon of varying tidal heights to the Moon and its phases. Bede starts by noting that the tides rise and fall 4/5 of an hour later each day, just as the Moon rises and sets 4/5 of an hour later. He goes on to emphasise that in two lunar months (59 days) the Moon circles the Earth 57 times and there are 114 tides. Bede then observes that the height of tides varies over the month. Increasing tides are called malinae and decreasing tides ledones and that the month is divided into four parts of seven or eight days with alternating malinae and ledones. In the same passage, he also notes the effect of winds to hold back tides. Bede also records that the time of tides varies from place to place. To the north of Bede's location (Monkwearmouth) the tides are earlier, to the south later. He explains that the tide "deserts these shores in order to be able all the more to be able to flood other [shores] when it arrives there" noting that "the Moon which signals the rise of tide here, signals its retreat in other regions far from this quarter of the heavens".

Later medieval understanding of the tides was primarily based on works of Muslim astronomers, which became available through Latin translation starting from the 12th century. Abu Ma'shar al-Balkhi (d. circa 886), in his Introductorium in astronomiam, taught that ebb and flood tides were caused by the Moon. Abu Ma'shar discussed the effects of wind and Moon's phases relative to the Sun on the tides. In the 12th century, al-Bitruji (d. circa 1204) contributed the notion that the tides were caused by the general circulation of the heavens.

Simon Stevin, in his 1608 De spiegheling der Ebbenvloet (The theory of ebb and flood), dismissed a large number of misconceptions that still existed about ebb and flood. Stevin pleaded for the idea that the attraction of the Moon was responsible for the tides and spoke in clear terms about ebb, flood, spring tide and neap tide, stressing that further research needed to be made.

In 1609, Johannes Kepler also correctly suggested that the gravitation of the Moon caused the tides, (Note: "Orbis virtutis tractoriæ, quæ est in Luna, porrigitur utque ad Terras, & prolectat aquas sub Zonam Torridam, ... Celeriter vero Luna verticem transvolante, cum aquæ tam celeriter sequi non possint, fluxus quidem fit Oceani sub Torrida in Occidentem, ... " (The sphere of the lifting power, which is [centered] in the moon, is extended as far as to the earth and attracts the waters under the torrid zone, ... However the moon flies swiftly across the zenith; because the waters cannot follow so quickly, the tide of the ocean under the torrid [zone] is indeed made to the west, ...") which he based upon ancient observations and correlations.

Galileo Galilei in his 1632 Dialogue Concerning the Two Chief World Systems, whose working title was Dialogue on the Tides, made his tidal theory a key element of his physical defense of Copernican heliocentrism, proposing that the tides result from the combined motions of the Earth's rotation and revolution. He explicitly rejected Kepler’s suggestion that the Moon influences the seas, dismissing such lunar attraction as an appeal to occult qualities rather than a mechanically intelligible cause.

Isaac Newton (1642–1727) was the first person to explain tides as the product of the gravitational attraction of astronomical masses. His explanation of the tides (and many other phenomena) was published in the Principia (1687) and used his theory of universal gravitation to explain the lunar and solar attractions as the origin of the tide-generating forces. (Note: See for example, in the 'Principia' (Book 1) (1729 translation), Corollaries 19 and 20 to Proposition 66, on pages 251–254, referring back to page 234 et seq.; and in Book 3 Propositions 24, 36 and 37, starting on page 255.) Newton and others before Pierre-Simon Laplace worked the problem from the perspective of a static system (equilibrium theory), that provided an approximation that described the tides that would occur in a non-inertial ocean evenly covering the whole Earth. The tide-generating force (or its corresponding potential) is still relevant to tidal theory, but as an intermediate quantity (forcing function) rather than as a final result; theory must also consider the Earth's accumulated dynamic tidal response to the applied forces, which response is influenced by ocean depth, the Earth's rotation, and other factors.

In 1740, the Académie Royale des Sciences in Paris offered a prize for the best theoretical essay on tides. Daniel Bernoulli, Leonhard Euler, Colin Maclaurin and Antoine Cavalleri shared the prize.

Maclaurin used Newton's theory to show that a smooth sphere covered by a sufficiently deep ocean under the tidal force of a single deforming body is a prolate spheroid (essentially a three-dimensional oval) with major axis directed toward the deforming body. Maclaurin was the first to write about the Earth's rotational effects on motion. Euler realized that the tidal force's horizontal component (more than the vertical) drives the tide. In 1744, Jean le Rond d'Alembert studied tidal equations for the atmosphere which did not include rotation.

In 1770, James Cook's barque HMS Endeavour grounded on the Great Barrier Reef. Attempts were made to refloat her on the following tide, which failed, but the tide after that lifted her clear with ease. Whilst she was being repaired in the mouth of the Endeavour River, Cook observed the tides over a period of seven weeks. At neap tides, both tides in a day were similar, but at springs the tides rose 7 feet (2.1 m) in the morning but 9 feet (2.7 m) in the evening.

Pierre-Simon Laplace formulated a system of partial differential equations relating the ocean's horizontal flow to its surface height, the first major dynamic theory for water tides. The Laplace tidal equations are still in use today. William Thomson, 1st Baron Kelvin, rewrote Laplace's equations in terms of vorticity which allowed for solutions describing tidally driven coastally trapped waves, known as Kelvin waves.

Others, including Kelvin and Henri Poincaré, further developed Laplace's theory. Based on these developments, and the lunar theory of E W Brown describing the motions of the Moon, Arthur Thomas Doodson developed and published in 1921 the first modern development of the tide-generating potential in harmonic form: Doodson distinguished 388 tidal frequencies. Some of his methods remain in use.

=== History of tidal observation ===
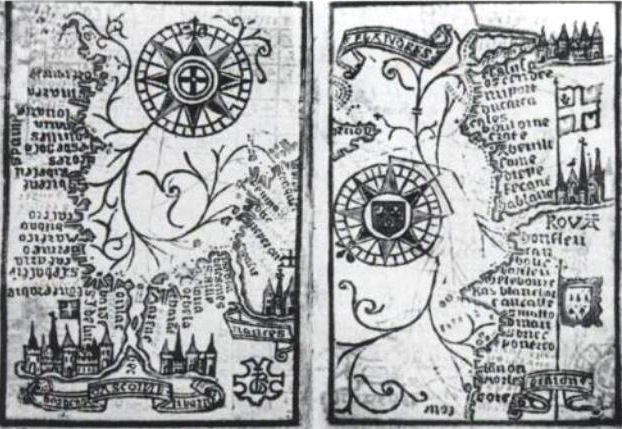
Brouscon's Almanach of 1546: Compass bearings of high waters in the Bay of Biscay (left) and the coast from Brittany to Dover (right).

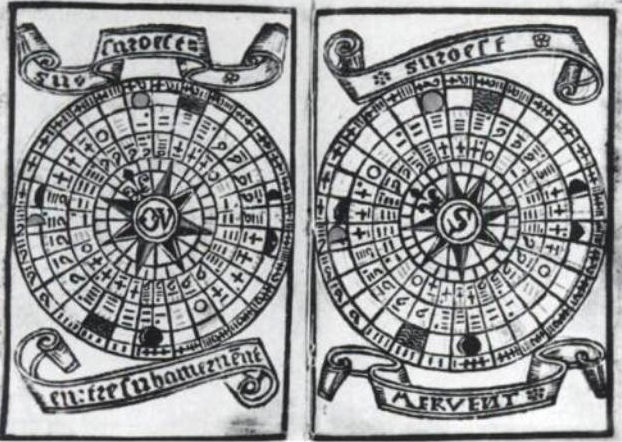
Brouscon's Almanach of 1546: Tidal diagrams "according to the age of the moon".

From ancient times, tidal observation and discussion has increased in sophistication, first marking the daily recurrence, then tides' relationship to the Sun and moon.

Early surviving accounts of tidal observation suggest that during his voyage to the British Isles around 325 BC, Pytheas observed tidal behavior that varied with the lunar cycle, fragments attributed to his On the Ocean indicate an early link between tidal range and lunar phases.

In the 2nd century BC, the Hellenistic astronomer Seleucus of Seleucia correctly described the phenomenon of tides in order to support his heliocentric theory. He correctly theorized that tides were caused by the moon, although he believed that the interaction was mediated by the pneuma. He noted that tides varied in time and strength in different parts of the world. According to Strabo (1.1.9), Seleucus was the first to link tides to the lunar attraction, and that the height of the tides depends on the moon's position relative to the Sun.

The Naturalis Historia of Pliny the Elder collates many tidal observations, e.g., the spring tides are a few days after (or before) new and full moon and are highest around the equinoxes, though Pliny noted many relationships now regarded as fanciful. In his Geography, Strabo described tides in the Persian Gulf having their greatest range when the moon was furthest from the plane of the Equator. All this despite the relatively small amplitude of Mediterranean basin tides. (The strong currents through the Euripus Strait and the Strait of Messina puzzled Aristotle.) Philostratus discussed tides in Book Five of The Life of Apollonius of Tyana. Philostratus mentions the moon, but attributes tides to "spirits". In Europe around 730 AD, the Venerable Bede described how the rising tide on one coast of the British Isles coincided with the fall on the other and described the time progression of high water along the Northumbrian coast.

The first tide table in China was recorded in 1056 AD primarily for visitors wishing to see the famous tidal bore in the Qiantang River. The first known British tide table is thought to be that of John Wallingford, who died Abbot of St. Albans in 1213, based on high water occurring 48 minutes later each day, and three hours earlier at the Thames mouth than upriver at London.

In 1614, Claude d'Abbeville published the work "Histoire de la mission de pères capucins en l'Isle de Maragnan et terres circonvoisines", where he exposed that the Tupinambá people already had an understanding of the relation between the Moon and the tides before Europe.

William Thomson (Lord Kelvin) led the first systematic harmonic analysis of tidal records starting in 1867. The main result was the building of a tide-predicting machine using a system of pulleys to add together six harmonic time functions. It was "programmed" by resetting gears and chains to adjust phasing and amplitudes. Similar machines were used until the 1960s.

The first known sea-level record of an entire spring–neap cycle was made in 1831 on the Navy Dock in the Thames Estuary. Many large ports had automatic tide gauge stations by 1850.

John Lubbock was one of the first to map co-tidal lines, for Great Britain, Ireland and adjacent coasts, in 1840. William Whewell expanded this work ending with a nearly global chart in 1836. In order to make these maps consistent, he hypothesized the existence of a region with no tidal rise or fall where co-tidal lines meet in the mid-ocean. The existence of such an amphidromic point, as they are now known, was confirmed in 1840 by Captain William Hewett, RN, from careful soundings in the North Sea.

Much later, in the late 20th century, geologists noticed tidal rhythmites, which document the occurrence of ancient tides in the geological record, notably in the Carboniferous.

== Physics ==
=== Equilibrium theory ===
Earth's rotation drags the position of the tidal bulge ahead of the position directly under the Moon showing the lag angle.

The simplest model, due to Isaac Newton that explains two daily tides is known as equilibrium theory. Equilibrium theory makes three simplifications: 1) ignore Earth's land, 2) ignore the viscosity of water so it can respond to gravity instantly, 3) ignore friction between the Earth and water. In a coordinate system rotating with the Earth-Moon pair, the distance between the Earth and Moon is constant: they are in equilibrium. This equilibrium can be explained as a balance of the force of the Moon's gravity and centrifugal force from rotation. At the center of the Earth, the forces are equal and opposite. For other points the forces do not exactly balance and the residual force is called the tide-generating force. For points on Earth's surface but closest to the Moon, gravity is very slightly stronger; or points farthest away, centrifugal force is slightly stronger. On the poles away from the Earth-Moon line, the small net force points into the Earth. The ocean water is barely affected by these forces. In between the poles and the equator, a component of the small force points horizontal to the surface of the Earth and towards the equator. No force opposes this small force. The ocean water flows in response to this force, leaving the poles and accumulating near the equator. The result is a double tidal bulge along the Earth-Moon axis, somewhat larger on the side closer to the Moon. As the Earth rotates on its axis, different points on Earth move through these bulges, roughly explaining the daily double tides. Both the oceans' water and the solid Earth experience these differences in pull, but the rigid Earth resists deformation and keeps its roughly spherical shape, while the fluid redistributes to match the imbalance, forming the bulges. The equilibrium tide is the idealized tide assuming a landless Earth.

=== Forces ===
The tidal force produced by a massive object (Moon, hereafter) on a small particle located on or in an extensive body (Earth, hereafter) is the vector difference between the gravitational force exerted by the Moon on the particle, and the gravitational force that would be exerted on the particle if it were located at the Earth's center of mass.

Whereas the gravitational force subjected by a celestial body on Earth varies inversely as the square of its distance to the Earth, the maximal tidal force varies inversely as, approximately, the cube of this distance. If the tidal force caused by each body were instead equal to its full gravitational force (which is not the case due to the free fall of the whole Earth, not only the oceans, towards these bodies) a different pattern of tidal forces would be observed, e.g. with a much stronger influence from the Sun than from the Moon: The solar gravitational force on the Earth is on average 179 times stronger than the lunar, but because the Sun is on average 389 times farther from the Earth, its field gradient is weaker. The overall proportionality is

$$\text{tidal force} \propto \frac{M}{d^3} \propto \rho\left(\frac{r}{d}\right)^3,$$

where M is the mass of the heavenly body, d is its distance, ρ is its average density, and r is its radius. The ratio r/d is related to the angle subtended by the object in the sky. Since the Sun and the Moon have practically the same diameter in the sky, the tidal force of the Sun is less than that of the Moon because its average density is much less, and it is only 46% as large as the lunar, (Note: According to NASA the lunar tidal force is 2.21 times larger than the solar.) thus during a spring tide, the Moon contributes 69% while the Sun contributes 31%. More precisely, the lunar tidal acceleration (along the Moon–Earth axis, at the Earth's surface) is about 1.1×10^{−7} g, while the solar tidal acceleration (along the Sun–Earth axis, at the Earth's surface) is about 0.52×10^{−7} g, where g is the gravitational acceleration at the Earth's surface. (Note: See Tidal force – Mathematical treatment and sources cited there.) The effects of the other planets vary as their distances from Earth vary. When Venus is closest to Earth, its effect is 0.000113 times the solar effect. At other times, Jupiter or Mars may have the most effect.

The lunar gravity residual field at the Earth's surface is known as the tide-generating force. This is the primary mechanism that drives tidal action and explains two simultaneous tidal bulges; Earth's rotation further accounts for two daily high waters at any location. The figure shows both the tidal field (thick red arrows) and the gravity field (thin blue arrows) exerted on Earth's surface and center (label O) by the Moon (label S). Note that this illustration exaggerates the differences in the actual Earth-Moon system, for clarity.

The ocean's surface is approximated by a surface referred to as the geoid, which takes into consideration the gravitational force exerted by the earth as well as centrifugal force due to rotation. Now consider the effect of massive external bodies such as the Moon and Sun. These bodies have strong gravitational fields that diminish with distance and cause the ocean's surface to deviate from the geoid. They establish a new equilibrium ocean surface which bulges toward the moon on one side and away from the moon on the other side. The earth's rotation relative to this shape causes the daily tidal cycle. The ocean surface tends toward this equilibrium shape, which is constantly changing, and never quite attains it. When the ocean surface is not aligned with it, it's as though the surface is sloping, and water accelerates in the down-slope direction.

=== Laplace's tidal equations ===
Ocean depths are much smaller than their horizontal extent. Thus, the response to tidal forcing can be modelled using the Laplace tidal equations which incorporate the following features:

- The vertical (or radial) velocity is negligible, and there is no vertical shear—this is a sheet flow.
- The forcing is only horizontal (tangential).
- The Coriolis effect appears as an inertial force (fictitious) acting laterally to the direction of flow and proportional to velocity.
- The surface height's rate of change is proportional to the negative divergence of velocity multiplied by the depth. As the horizontal velocity stretches or compresses the ocean as a sheet, the volume thins or thickens, respectively.

The boundary conditions dictate no flow across the coastline and free slip at the bottom.

The Coriolis effect (inertial force) steers flows moving towards the Equator to the west and flows moving away from the Equator toward the east, allowing coastally trapped waves. Finally, a dissipation term can be added which is an analog to viscosity.

=== Amplitude and cycle time ===
The theoretical amplitude of oceanic tides caused by the Moon is about 54 centimetres (21 in) at the highest point, which corresponds to the amplitude that would be reached if the ocean possessed a uniform depth, there were no landmasses, and the Earth were rotating in step with the Moon's orbit. The Sun similarly causes tides, of which the theoretical amplitude is about 25 centimetres (9.8 in) (46% of that of the Moon) with a cycle time of 12 hours. At spring tide, the two effects add to each other to a theoretical level of 79 centimetres (31 in), while at neap tide the theoretical level is reduced to 29 centimetres (11 in). Since the orbits of the Earth about the Sun, and the Moon about the Earth, are elliptical, tidal amplitudes change somewhat as a result of the varying Earth–Sun and Earth–Moon distances. This causes a variation in the tidal force and theoretical amplitude of about ±18% for the Moon and ±5% for the Sun. If both the Sun and Moon were at their closest positions and aligned at new moon, the theoretical amplitude would reach 93 centimetres (37 in).

Real amplitudes differ considerably, not only because of depth variations and continental obstacles, but also because wave propagation across the ocean has a natural period of the same order of magnitude as the rotation period: if there were no land masses, it would take about 30 hours for a long wavelength surface wave to propagate along the Equator halfway around the Earth (by comparison, the Earth's lithosphere has a natural period of about 57 minutes). Earth tides, which raise and lower the bottom of the ocean, and the tide's own gravitational self attraction are both significant and further complicate the ocean's response to tidal forces.

=== Dissipation ===
Earth's tidal oscillations introduce dissipation at an average rate of about 3.75 terawatts. About 98% of this dissipation is by marine tidal movement. Dissipation arises as basin-scale tidal flows drive smaller-scale flows which experience turbulent dissipation. This tidal drag creates torque on the moon that gradually transfers angular momentum to its orbit, and a gradual increase in Earth–moon separation. The equal and opposite torque on the Earth correspondingly decreases its rotational velocity. Thus, over geologic time, the moon recedes from the Earth, at about 3.8 centimetres (1.5 in)/year, lengthening the terrestrial day. (Note: The day is currently lengthening at a rate of about 0.002 seconds per century.)

Day length has increased by about 2 hours in the last 600 million years. Assuming (as a crude approximation) that the deceleration rate has been constant, this would imply that 70 million years ago, day length was on the order of 1% shorter with about 4 more days per year.

=== Bathymetry ===
The shape of the shoreline and the ocean floor changes the way that tides propagate, so there is no simple, general rule that predicts the time of high water from the Moon's position in the sky. Coastal characteristics such as underwater bathymetry and coastline shape mean that individual location characteristics affect tide forecasting; actual high water time and height may differ from model predictions due to the coastal morphology's effects on tidal flow. However, for a given location the relationship between lunar altitude and the time of high or low tide (the lunitidal interval) is relatively constant and predictable, as is the time of high or low tide relative to other points on the same coast. For example, the high tide at Norfolk, Virginia, U.S., predictably occurs approximately two and a half hours before the Moon passes directly overhead.

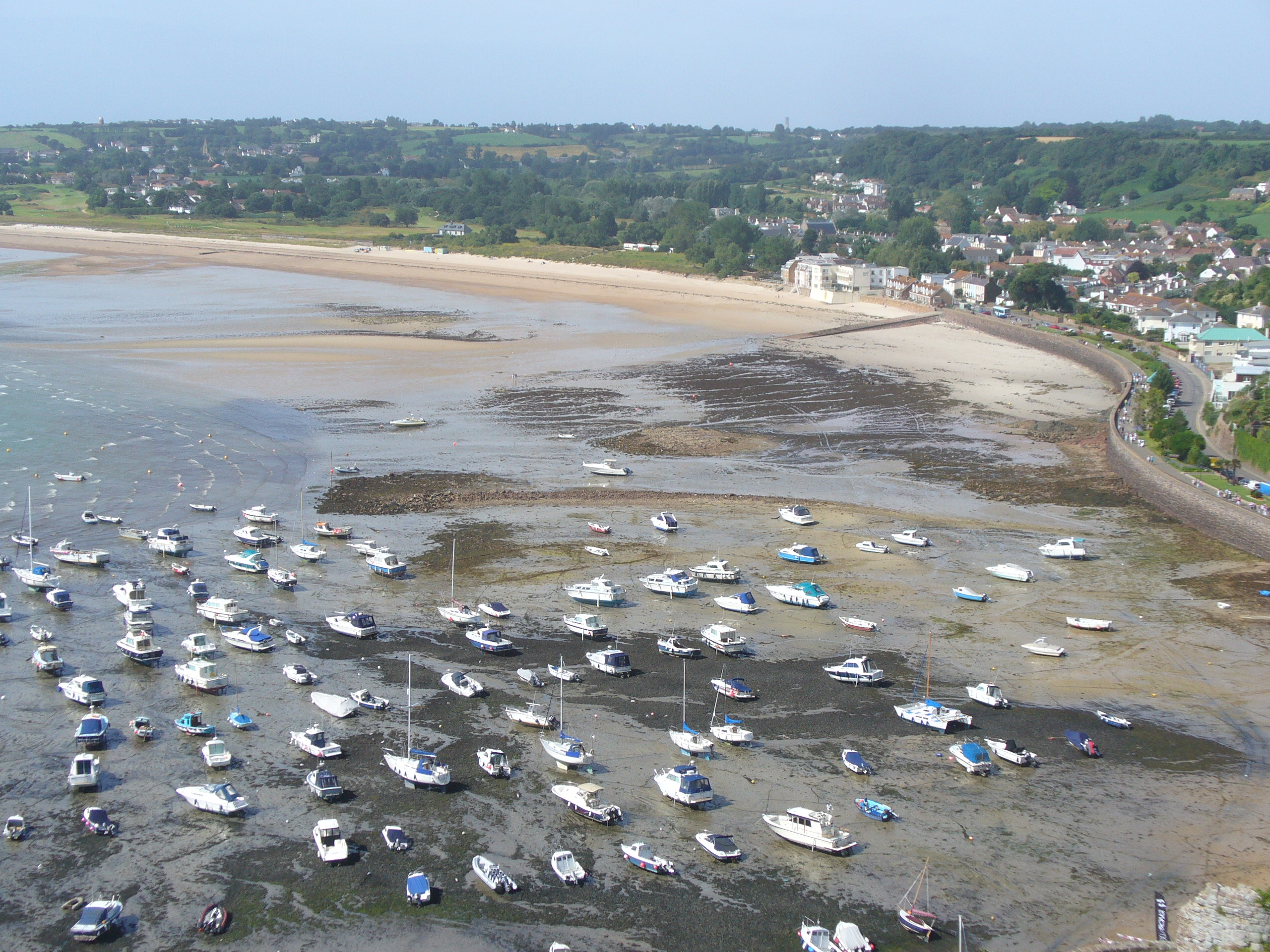
The harbour of Gorey, Jersey, falls dry at low tide.

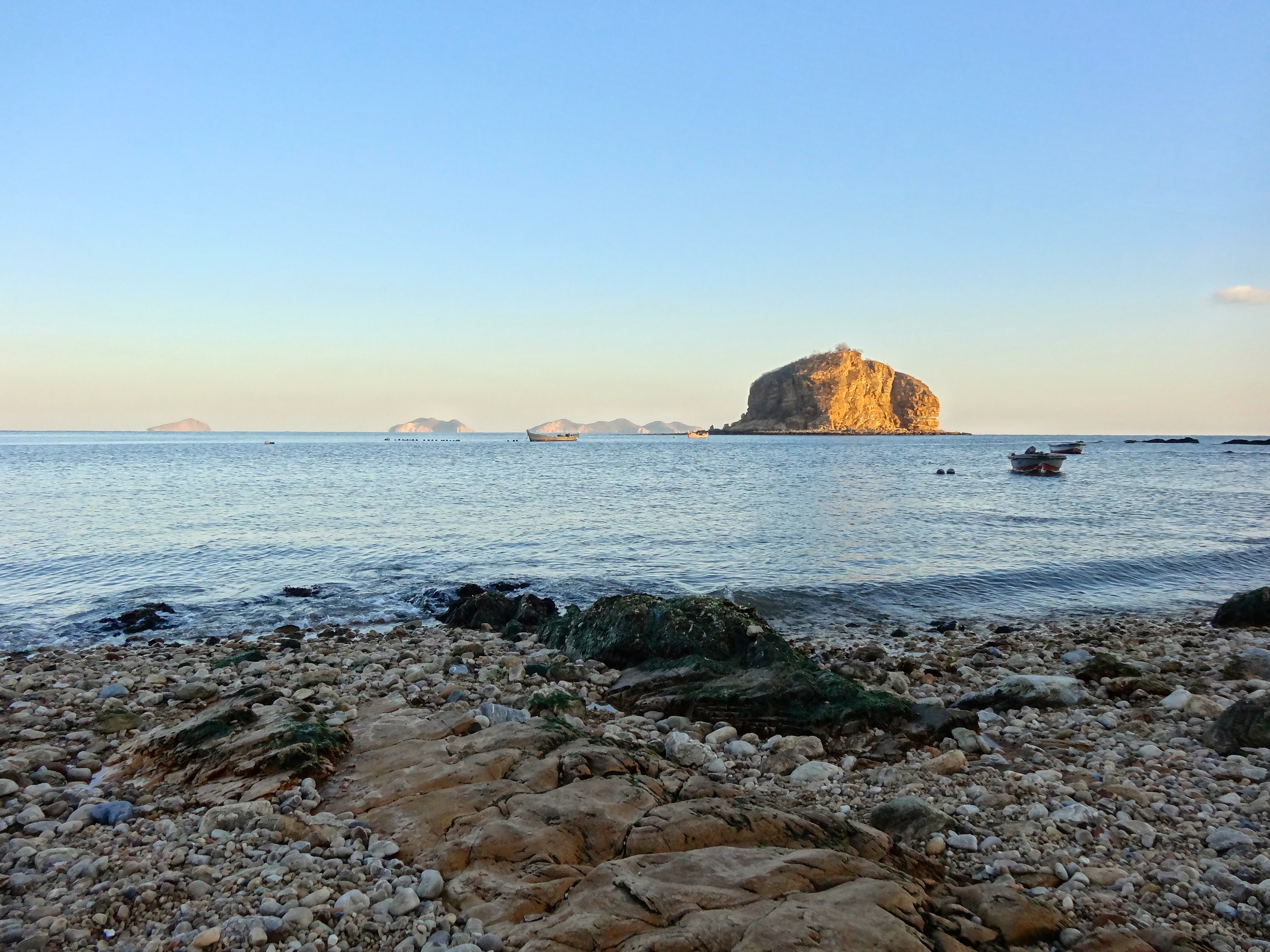
Low tide at Bangchuidao scenic area, Dalian, Liaoning Province, China

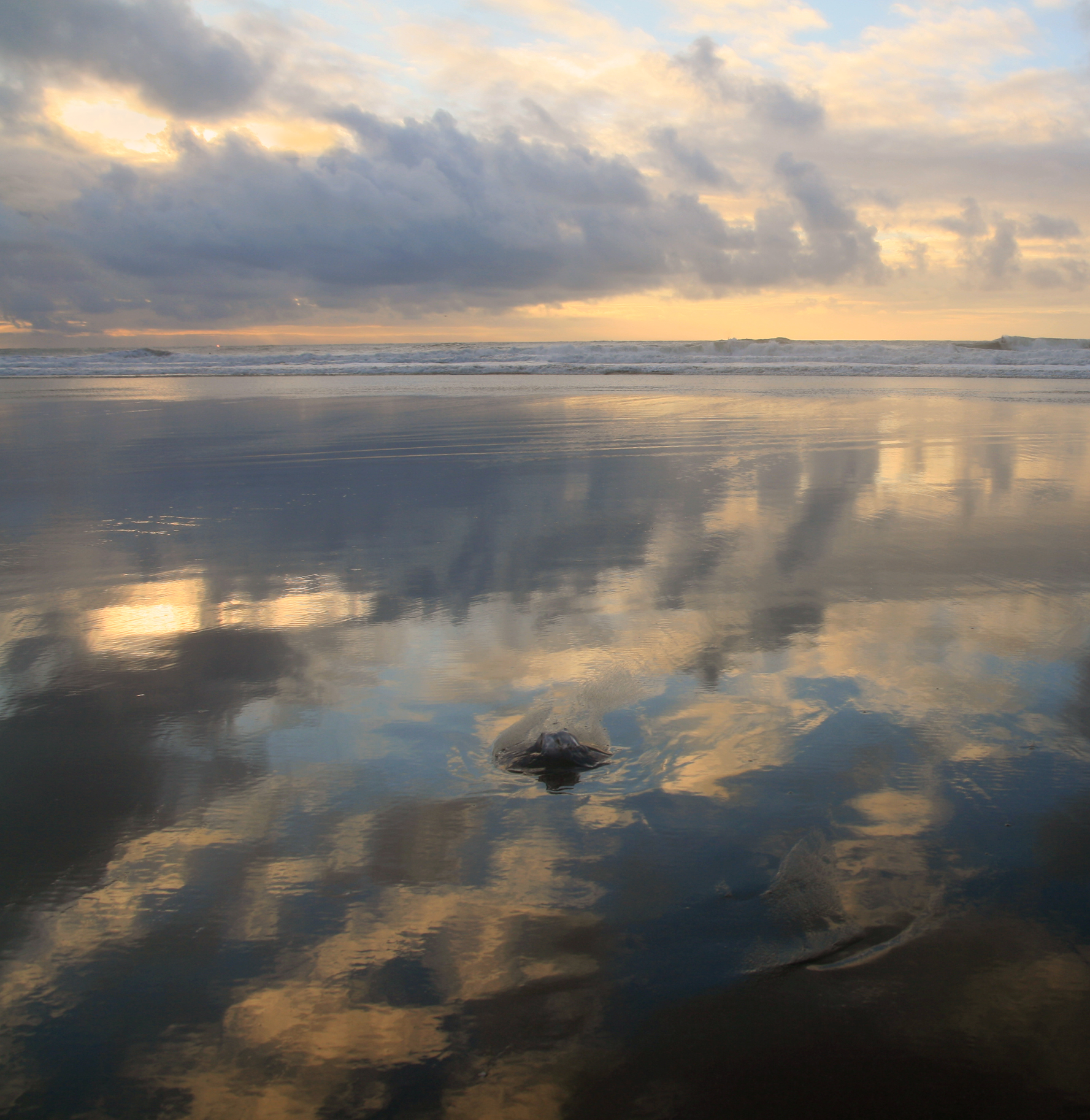
Low tide at Ocean Beach in San Francisco, California, U.S.

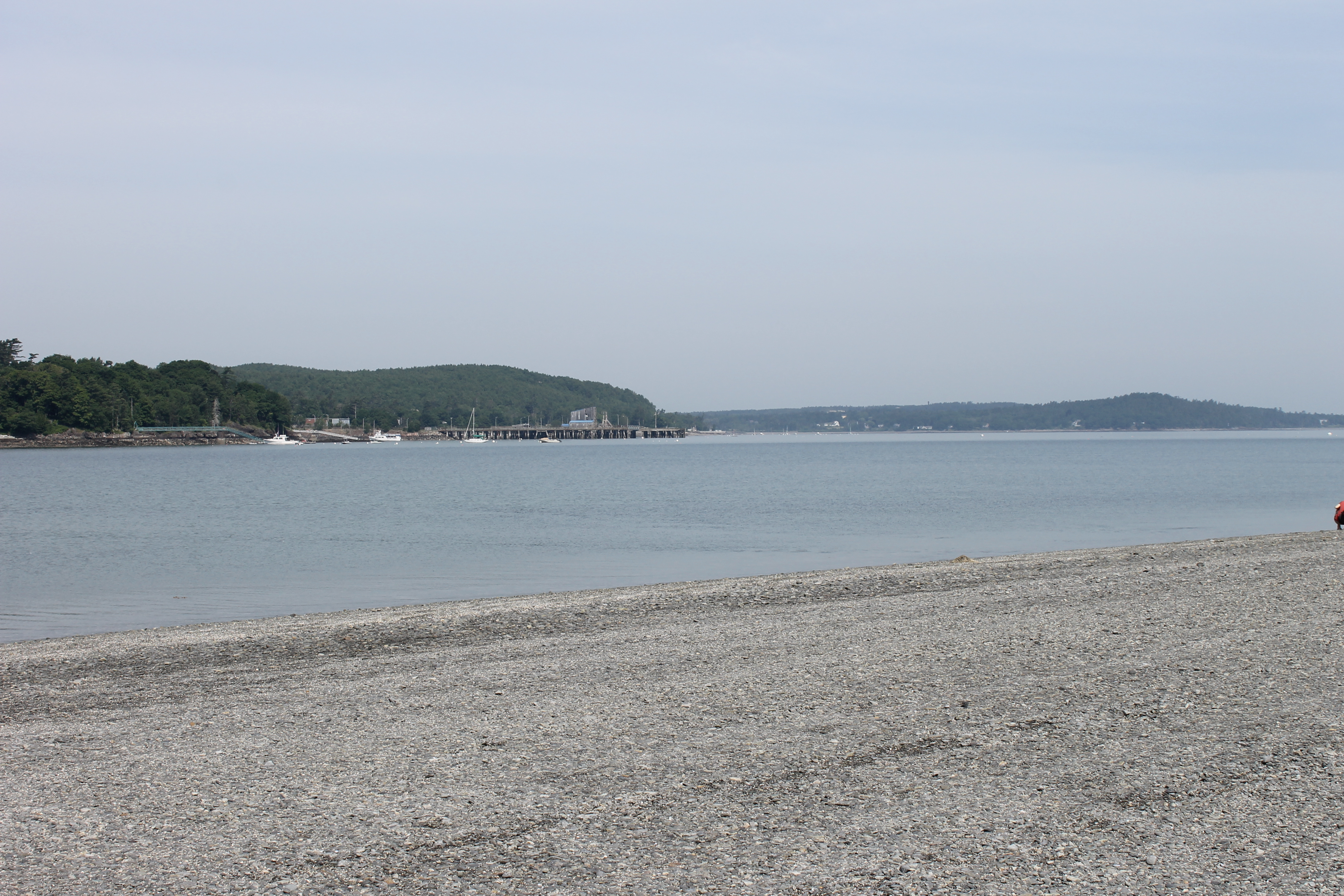
Low tide at Bar Harbor, Maine, U.S. (2014)

Land masses and ocean basins act as barriers against water moving freely around the globe, and their varied shapes and sizes affect the size of tidal frequencies. As a result, tidal patterns vary. For example, in the U.S., the East coast has predominantly semi-diurnal tides, as do Europe's Atlantic coasts, while the West coast predominantly has mixed tides. Human changes to the landscape can also significantly alter local tides.

== Observation and prediction ==
=== Timing ===
The tidal forces due to the Moon and Sun generate very long waves which travel all around the ocean following the paths shown in co-tidal charts. The time when the crest of the wave reaches a port then gives the time of high water at the port. The time taken for the wave to travel around the ocean also means that there is a delay between the phases of the Moon and their effect on the tide. Springs and neaps in the North Sea, for example, are two days behind the new/full moon and first/third quarter moon. This is called the tide's age.

The ocean bathymetry greatly influences the tide's exact time and height at a particular coastal point. There are some extreme cases; the Bay of Fundy, on the east coast of Canada, is often stated to have the world's highest tides because of its shape, bathymetry, and its distance from the continental shelf edge. Measurements made in November 1998 at Burntcoat Head in the Bay of Fundy recorded a maximum range of 16.3 metres (53 ft) and a highest predicted extreme of 17 metres (56 ft). Similar measurements made in March 2002 at Leaf Basin, Ungava Bay in northern Quebec gave similar values (allowing for measurement errors), a maximum range of 16.2 metres (53 ft) and a highest predicted extreme of 16.8 metres (55 ft). Ungava Bay and the Bay of Fundy lie similar distances from the continental shelf edge, but Ungava Bay is only free of pack ice for about four months every year while the Bay of Fundy rarely freezes.

Southampton in the United Kingdom has a double high water caused by the interaction between the M_{2} and M_{4} tidal constituents (Shallow water overtides of principal lunar). Portland has double low waters for the same reason. The M_{4} tide is found all along the south coast of the United Kingdom, but its effect is most noticeable between the Isle of Wight and Portland because the M_{2} tide is lowest in this region.

Because the oscillation modes of the Mediterranean Sea and the Baltic Sea do not coincide with any significant astronomical forcing period, the largest tides are close to their narrow connections with the Atlantic Ocean. Extremely small tides also occur for the same reason in the Gulf of Mexico and Sea of Japan. Elsewhere, as along the southern coast of Australia, low tides can be due to the presence of a nearby amphidrome.

=== Analysis ===
A regular water level chart

Isaac Newton's theory of gravitation first enabled an explanation of why there were generally two tides a day, not one, and offered hope for a detailed understanding of tidal forces and behavior. Although it may seem that tides could be predicted via a sufficiently detailed knowledge of instantaneous astronomical forcings, the actual tide at a given location is determined by astronomical forces accumulated by the body of water over many days. In addition, accurate results would require detailed knowledge of the shape of all the ocean basins—their bathymetry, and coastline shape.

Current procedure for analysing tides follows the method of harmonic analysis introduced in the 1860s by William Thomson. It is based on the principle that the astronomical theories of the motions of Sun and Moon determine a large number of component frequencies, and at each frequency there is a component of force tending to produce tidal motion, but that at each place of interest on the Earth, the tides respond at each frequency with an amplitude and phase peculiar to that locality. At each place of interest, the tide heights are therefore measured for a period of time sufficiently long (usually more than a year in the case of a new port not previously studied) to enable the response at each significant tide-generating frequency to be distinguished by analysis, and to extract the tidal constants for a sufficient number of the strongest known components of the astronomical tidal forces to enable practical tide prediction. The tide heights are expected to follow the tidal force, with a constant amplitude and phase delay for each component. Because astronomical frequencies and phases can be calculated with certainty, the tide height at other times can then be predicted once the response to the harmonic components of the astronomical tide-generating forces has been found.

The main patterns in the tides are

- the twice-daily variation
- the difference between the first and second tide of a day
- the spring–neap cycle
- the annual variation

The Highest Astronomical Tide is the perigean spring tide when both the Sun and Moon are closest to the Earth.

When confronted by a periodically varying function, the standard approach is to employ Fourier series, a form of analysis that uses sinusoidal functions as a basis set, having frequencies that are zero, one, two, three, etc. times the frequency of a particular fundamental cycle. These multiples are called harmonics of the fundamental frequency, and the process is termed harmonic analysis. If the basis set of sinusoidal functions suit the behaviour being modelled, relatively few harmonic terms need to be added. Orbital paths are very nearly circular, so sinusoidal variations are suitable for tides.

For the analysis of tide heights, the Fourier series approach has in practice to be made more elaborate than the use of a single frequency and its harmonics. The tidal patterns are decomposed into many sinusoids having many fundamental frequencies, corresponding (as in the lunar theory) to many different combinations of the motions of the Earth, the Moon, and the angles that define the shape and location of their orbits.

For tides, then, harmonic analysis is not limited to harmonics of a single frequency. (Note: To demonstrate this Tides Home Page offers a tidal height pattern converted into an .mp3 sound file, and the rich sound is quite different from a pure tone.) In other words, the harmonies are multiples of many fundamental frequencies, not just of the fundamental frequency of the simpler Fourier series approach. Their representation as a Fourier series having only one fundamental frequency and its (integer) multiples would require many terms, and would be severely limited in the time-range for which it would be valid.

The study of tide height by harmonic analysis was begun by Laplace, William Thomson (Lord Kelvin), and George Darwin. A. T. Doodson extended their work, introducing the Doodson Number notation to organise the hundreds of resulting terms. This approach has been the international standard ever since, and the complications arise as follows: the tide-raising force is notionally given by sums of several terms. Each term is of the form

$$A_o \cos(\omega t + p),$$

where

A_{o} is the amplitude,
ω is the angular frequency, usually given in degrees per hour, corresponding to t measured in hours,
p is the phase offset with regard to the astronomical state at time t = 0.

There is one term for the Moon and a second term for the Sun. The phase p of the first harmonic for the Moon term is called the lunitidal interval or high water interval.

The next refinement is to accommodate the harmonic terms due to the elliptical shape of the orbits. To do so, the value of the amplitude is taken to be not a constant, but varying with time, about the average amplitude A_{o}. To do so, replace A_{o} in the above equation with A(t) where A is another sinusoid, similar to the cycles and epicycles of Ptolemaic theory. This gives

$$A(t) = A_o\bigl(1 + A_a \cos(\omega_a t + p_a)\bigr),$$

which is to say an average value A_{o} with a sinusoidal variation about it of magnitude A_{a}, with frequency ω_{a} and phase p_{a}. Substituting this for A_{o} in the original equation gives a product of two cosine factors:

$$A_o \bigl( 1 + A_a \cos(\omega_a t + p_a)\bigr) \cos(\omega t + p).$$

Given that for any x and y

$$\cos x \cos y = \tfrac{1}{2} \cos(x + y) + \tfrac{1}{2} \cos(x - y),$$

it is clear that a compound term involving the product of two cosine terms each with their own frequency is the same as three simple cosine terms that are to be added at the original frequency and also at frequencies which are the sum and difference of the two frequencies of the product term. (Three, not two terms, since the whole expression is $(1 + \cos x) \cos y$.) Consider further that the tidal force on a location depends also on whether the Moon (or the Sun) is above or below the plane of the Equator, and that these attributes have their own periods also incommensurable with a day and a month, and it is clear that many combinations result. With a careful choice of the basic astronomical frequencies, the Doodson Number annotates the particular additions and differences to form the frequency of each simple cosine term.

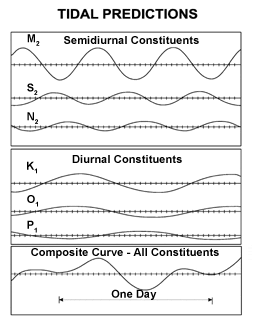
Tidal prediction summing constituent parts. The tidal coefficients are defined on the page theory of tides.

Remember that astronomical tides do not include weather effects. Also, changes to local conditions (sandbank movement, dredging harbour mouths, etc.) away from those prevailing at the measurement time affect the tide's actual timing and magnitude. Organisations quoting a "highest astronomical tide" for some location may exaggerate the figure as a safety factor against analytical uncertainties, distance from the nearest measurement point, changes since the last observation time, ground subsidence, etc., to avert liability should an engineering work be overtopped. Special care is needed when assessing the size of a "weather surge" by subtracting the astronomical tide from the observed tide.

Careful Fourier data analysis over a nineteen-year period (the National Tidal Datum Epoch in the U.S.) uses frequencies called the tidal harmonic constituents. Nineteen years is preferred because the Earth, Moon and Sun's relative positions repeat almost exactly in the Metonic cycle of 19 years, which is long enough to include the 18.613 year lunar nodal tidal constituent. This analysis can be done using only the knowledge of the forcing period, but without detailed understanding of the mathematical derivation, which means that useful tidal tables have been constructed for centuries. The resulting amplitudes and phases can then be used to predict the expected tides. These are usually dominated by the constituents near 12 hours (the semi-diurnal constituents), but there are major constituents near 24 hours (diurnal) as well. Longer term constituents are 14 day or fortnightly, monthly, and semiannual. Semi-diurnal tides dominated coastline, but some areas such as the South China Sea and the Gulf of Mexico are primarily diurnal. In the semi-diurnal areas, the primary constituents M_{2} (lunar) and S_{2} (solar) periods differ slightly, so that the relative phases, and thus the amplitude of the combined tide, change fortnightly (14 day period).

In the M_{2} plot above, each cotidal line differs by one hour from its neighbors, and the thicker lines show tides in phase with equilibrium at Greenwich. The lines rotate around the amphidromic points counterclockwise in the northern hemisphere so that from Baja California Peninsula to Alaska and from France to Ireland the M_{2} tide propagates northward. In the southern hemisphere this direction is clockwise. On the other hand, M_{2} tide propagates counterclockwise around New Zealand, but this is because the islands act as a dam and permit the tides to have different heights on the islands' opposite sides. (The tides do propagate northward on the east side and southward on the west coast, as predicted by theory.)

The exception is at Cook Strait where the tidal currents periodically link high to low water. This is because cotidal lines 180° around the amphidromes are in opposite phase, for example high water across from low water at each end of Cook Strait. Each tidal constituent has a different pattern of amplitudes, phases, and amphidromic points, so the M_{2} patterns cannot be used for other tide components.

=== Tide table ===
A tide table can be used for any given locale to find the predicted times and amplitude (or "tidal range"). The predictions are influenced by many factors including the alignment of the Sun and Moon, the phase and amplitude of the tide (pattern of tides in the deep ocean), the amphidromic systems of the oceans, and the shape of the coastline and near-shore bathymetry (see Timing).

Tables provide predictions, the actual time and height of the tide is affected by wind and atmospheric pressure. (Note: Coastal orientation and geometry affects the phase, direction, and amplitude of amphidromic systems, coastal Kelvin waves as well as resonant seiches in bays. In estuaries, seasonal river outflows influence tidal flow.)

=== Example calculation ===
Tides at Bridgeport, Connecticut, U.S., during a 50-hour period.

Tides at Bridgeport, Connecticut, U.S., during a 30-day period.

Tides at Bridgeport, Connecticut, U.S., during a 400-day period.

Because the Moon is moving in its orbit around the Earth and in the same sense as the Earth's rotation, a point on the Earth must rotate slightly further to catch up so that the time between semi-diurnal tides is not twelve but 12.4206 hours—a bit over twenty-five minutes extra. The two peaks are not equal. The two high tides a day alternate in maximum heights: lower high (just under three feet), higher high (just over three feet), and again lower high. Likewise for the low tides.

When the Earth, Moon, and Sun are in line (Sun–Earth–Moon, or Sun–Moon–Earth) the two main influences combine to produce spring tides; when the two forces are opposing each other as when the angle Moon–Earth–Sun is close to ninety degrees, neap tides result. As the Moon moves around its orbit it changes from north of the Equator to south of the Equator. The alternation in high tide heights becomes smaller, until they are the same (at the lunar equinox, the Moon is above the Equator), then redevelop but with the other polarity, waxing to a maximum difference and then waning again.

=== Current ===
The tides' influence on current or flow is much more difficult to analyze, and data is much more difficult to collect. A tidal height is a scalar quantity and varies smoothly over a wide region. A flow is a vector quantity, with magnitude and direction, both of which can vary substantially with depth and over short distances due to local bathymetry. Also, although a water channel's center is the most useful measuring site, mariners object when current-measuring equipment obstructs waterways. A flow proceeding up a curved channel may have similar magnitude, even though its direction varies continuously along the channel. Surprisingly, flood and ebb flows are often not in opposite directions. Flow direction is determined by the upstream channel's shape, not the downstream channel's shape. Likewise, eddies may form in only one flow direction.

Nevertheless, tidal current analysis is similar to tidal heights analysis: in the simple case, at a given location the flood flow is in mostly one direction, and the ebb flow in another direction. Flood velocities are given positive sign, and ebb velocities negative sign. Analysis proceeds as though these are tide heights.

In more complex situations, the main ebb and flood flows do not dominate. Instead, the flow direction and magnitude trace an ellipse over a tidal cycle (on a polar plot) instead of along the ebb and flood lines. In this case, analysis might proceed along pairs of directions, with the primary and secondary directions at right angles. An alternative is to treat the tidal flows as complex numbers, as each value has both a magnitude and a direction.

Tide flow information is most commonly seen on nautical charts, presented as a table of flow speeds and bearings at hourly intervals, with separate tables for spring and neap tides. The timing is relative to high water at some harbour where the tidal behaviour is similar in pattern, though it may be far away.

As with tide height predictions, tide flow predictions based only on astronomical factors do not incorporate weather conditions, which can completely change the outcome.

==== Cook Strait ====
The tidal flow through Cook Strait between the two main islands of New Zealand is particularly interesting, as the tides on each side of the strait are almost exactly out of phase, so that one side's high water is simultaneous with the other's low water. Strong currents result, with almost zero tidal height change in the strait's center. Yet, although the tidal surge normally flows in one direction for six hours and in the reverse direction for six hours, a particular surge might last eight or ten hours with the reverse surge enfeebled. In especially boisterous weather conditions, the reverse surge might be entirely overcome so that the flow continues in the same direction through three or more surge periods.

The character of the Cook Strait's tidal cycle also differs between coasts. On the west coast and Tasman/Golden Bay, tidal ranges tend to follow a classic fortnightly spring–neap cycle, with larger ranges at springs and smaller ranges at neaps, driven by the alignment of the Moon and Sun. In contrast, on parts of the east coast, such as around Wellington and Napier, the tidal pattern shows a stronger monthly modulation related to perigean–apogean signals (Moon’s varying distance), and does not exhibit as pronounced a fortnightly spring–neap signal.

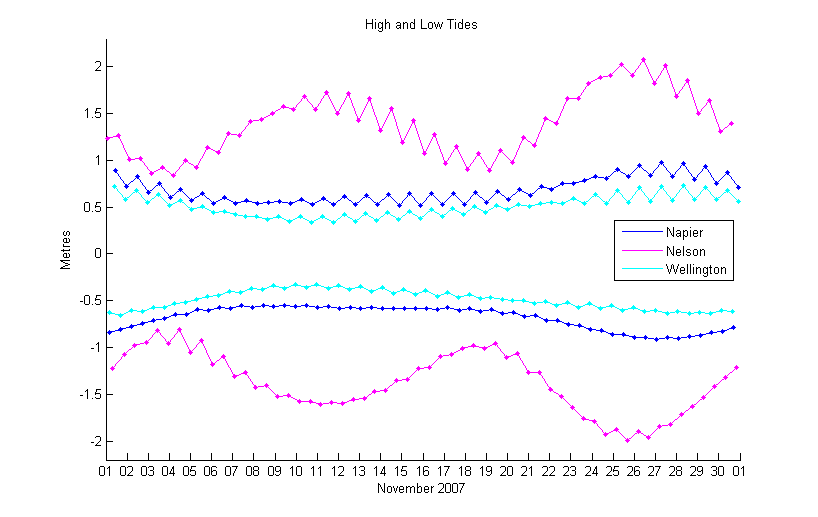
Tidal patterns in Cook Strait. The south part (Nelson) has two spring tides per month, versus only one on the north side (Wellington and Napier).

The graph of Cook Strait's tides shows separately the high water and low water height and time, through November 2007; these are not measured values but instead are calculated from tidal parameters derived from years-old measurements. Cook Strait's nautical chart offers tidal current information. For instance the January 1979 edition for 41°13.9′S 174°29.6′E (northwest of Cape Terawhiti) refers timings to Westport while the January 2004 issue refers to Wellington.

Near Cape Terawhiti in the middle of Cook Strait the tidal height variation is almost nil while the tidal current reaches its maximum, especially near the notorious Karori Rip. Aside from weather effects, the actual currents through Cook Strait are influenced by the tidal height differences between the two ends of the strait and as can be seen, only one of the two spring tides at the north west end of the strait near Nelson has a counterpart spring tide at the south east end (Wellington), so the resulting behaviour follows neither reference harbour.

==== Nantucket Shoals ====
In the Nantucket Shoals region of the Atlantic Ocean, tidal currents are rotary in character, meaning the direction of flow gradually changes through all compass directions over a tidal cycle rather than simply reversing back and forth along the same line. Over the shoals, the currents tend to turn clockwise, with typical peak velocities in the range of 1.5 to 2.5 knots, and minimums around 0.5 knot, though velocities can vary significantly with position and tidal phase. Because the current direction steadily rotates rather than abruptly reversing, there is no distinct slack water period as found in simple reversing currents; instead, the current speed waxes and wanes throughout the cycle while its direction continuously shifts.

Off the southeast end of Great Round Shoal, the tidal current is also rotary and turns clockwise, with an average velocity at strength of 1.3 knots and an average minimum velocity of 0.3 knot.

=== Power generation ===
Tidal energy can be extracted by two means: inserting a water turbine into a tidal current, or building ponds that release/admit water through a turbine. In the first case, the energy amount is entirely determined by the timing and tidal current magnitude. However, the best currents may be unavailable because the turbines would obstruct ships. In the second, the impoundment dams are expensive to construct, natural water cycles are completely disrupted, ship navigation is disrupted. However, with multiple ponds, power can be generated at chosen times. So far, there are few installed systems for tidal power generation (most famously, La Rance at Saint Malo, France) which face many difficulties. Aside from environmental issues, simply withstanding corrosion and biological fouling pose engineering challenges.

Tidal power is more predictable than wind energy, but turbine efficiency drops at low flow velocity, and because power scales with the cube of velocity, peak output is brief. Fluctuations can be mitigated through energy storage, advanced turbine controls, distributed tidal arrays, or hybridization with other renewables.

== Navigation ==
US civil and maritime uses of tidal data

Tidal flows are important for navigation, and significant errors in position occur if they are not accommodated. Tidal heights are also important; for example many rivers and harbours have a shallow "bar" at the entrance which prevents boats with significant draft from entering at low tide.

Until the advent of automated navigation, competence in calculating tidal effects was important to naval officers. The certificate of examination for lieutenants in the Royal Navy once declared that the prospective officer was able to "shift his tides".

Tidal flow timings and velocities appear in tide charts or a tidal stream atlas. Tide charts come in sets. Each chart covers a single hour between one high water and another (they ignore the leftover 24 minutes) and show the average tidal flow for that hour. An arrow on the tidal chart indicates the direction and the average flow speed (usually in knots) for spring and neap tides. If a tide chart is not available, most nautical charts have "tidal diamonds" which relate specific points on the chart to a table giving tidal flow direction and speed.

The standard procedure to counteract tidal effects on navigation is to (1) calculate a "dead reckoning" position (or DR) from travel distance and direction, (2) mark the chart (with a vertical cross like a plus sign) and (3) draw a line from the DR in the tide's direction. The distance the tide moves the boat along this line is computed by the tidal speed, and this gives an "estimated position" or EP (traditionally marked with a dot in a triangle).

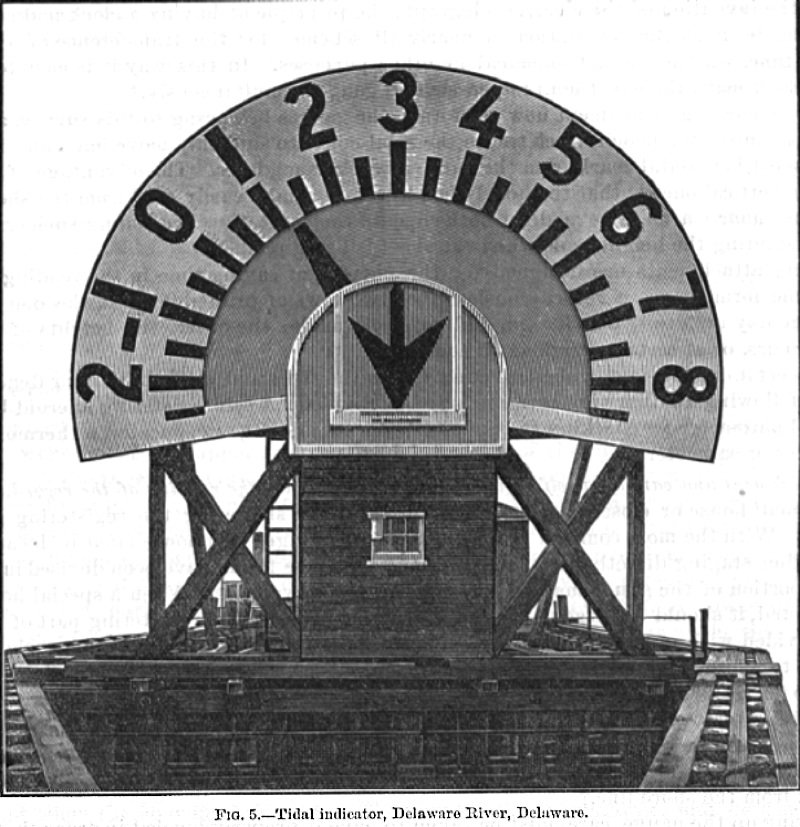
Tidal Indicator, Delaware River, Delaware, c. 1897. At the time shown in the figure, the tide is 1 1/4 feet above mean low water and is still falling, as indicated by pointing of the arrow. Indicator is powered by system of pulleys, cables and a float. (Report Of The Superintendent Of The Coast & Geodetic Survey Showing The Progress Of The Work During The Fiscal Year Ending With June 1897 (p. 483))

Nautical charts display the water's "charted depth" at specific locations with "soundings" and the use of bathymetric contour lines to depict the submerged surface's shape. These depths are relative to a "chart datum", which is typically the water level at the lowest possible astronomical tide (although other datums are commonly used, especially historically, and tides may be lower or higher for meteorological reasons) and are therefore the minimum possible water depth during the tidal cycle. "Drying heights" may also be shown on the chart, which are the heights of the exposed seabed at the lowest astronomical tide.

Tide tables list each day's high and low water heights and times. To calculate the actual water depth, add the charted depth to the published tide height. Depth for other times can be derived from tidal curves published for major ports. The rule of twelfths can suffice if an accurate curve is not available. This approximation presumes that the increase in depth in the six hours between low and high water is: first hour — 1/12, second — 2/12, third — 3/12, fourth — 3/12, fifth — 2/12, sixth — 1/12.

== Biological aspects ==
=== Intertidal ecology ===
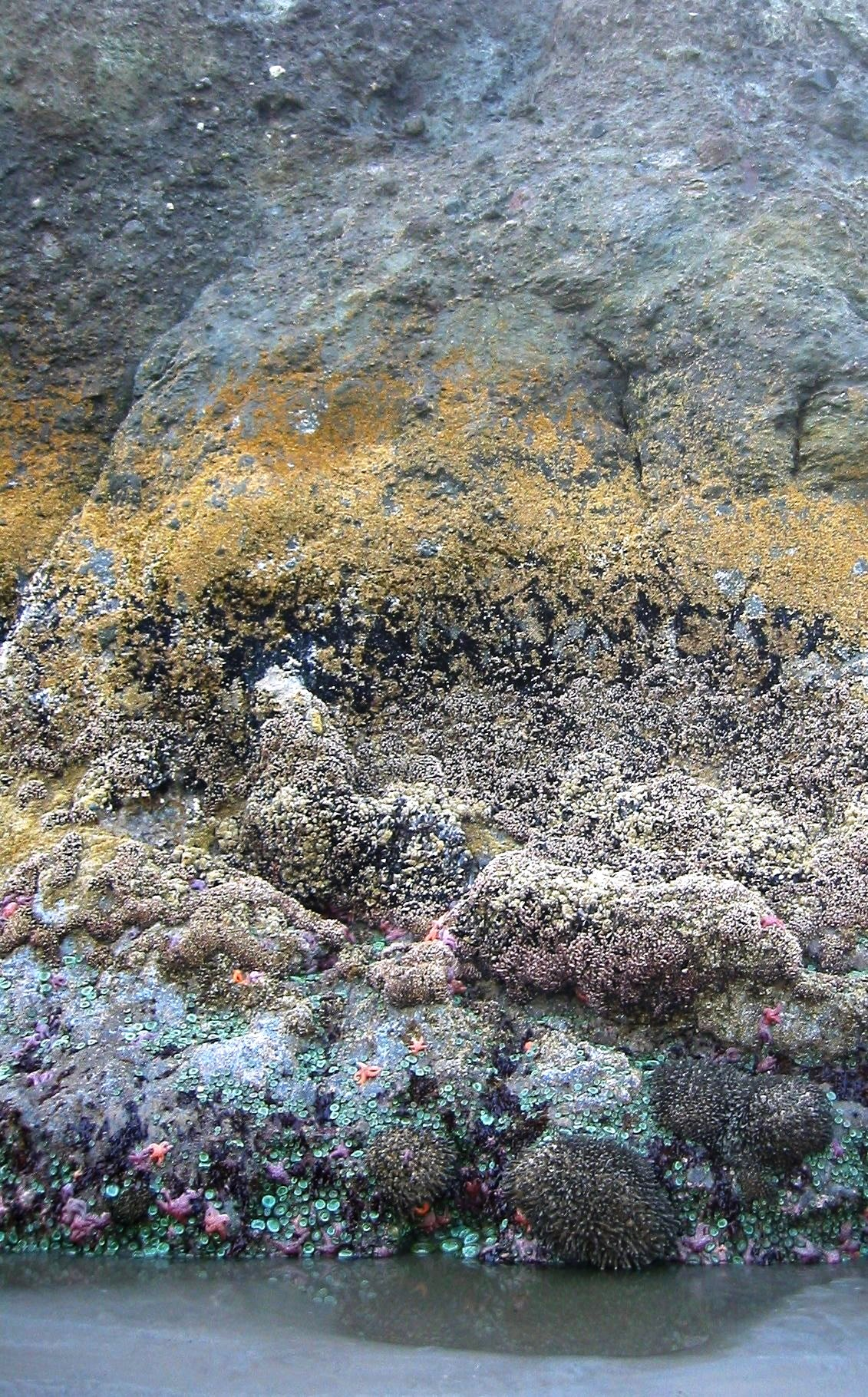
A rock, seen at low water, exhibiting typical intertidal zonation

Intertidal ecology is the study of ecosystems between the low- and high-water lines along a shore. At low water, the intertidal zone is exposed (or emersed), whereas at high water, it is underwater (or immersed). Intertidal ecologists therefore study the interactions between intertidal organisms and their environment, as well as among the different species. The most important interactions may vary according to the type of intertidal community. The broadest classifications are based on substrates—rocky shore or soft bottom.

Intertidal organisms experience a highly variable and often hostile environment, and have adapted to cope with and even exploit these conditions. One easily visible feature is vertical zonation, in which the community divides into distinct horizontal bands of specific species at each elevation above low water. A species' ability to cope with desiccation determines its upper limit, while competition with other species sets its lower limit.

Humans use intertidal regions for food and recreation. Overexploitation can damage intertidals directly. Other anthropogenic actions such as introducing invasive species and climate change have large negative effects. Marine Protected Areas are one option communities can apply to protect these areas and aid scientific research.

=== Biological rhythms ===
The approximately 12-hour and fortnightly tidal cycle has large effects on intertidal and marine organisms. Hence their biological rhythms tend to occur in rough multiples of these periods. Many other animals such as the vertebrates, display similar circatidal rhythms. Examples include gestation and egg hatching. In humans, the menstrual cycle lasts roughly a lunar month, an even multiple of the tidal period. Such parallels at least hint at the common descent of all animals from a marine ancestor.

== Other tides ==
=== Internal tides ===
When oscillating tidal currents in the stratified ocean flow over uneven bottom topography, they generate internal waves with tidal frequencies.

=== Lake tides ===
Large lakes such as Superior and Erie can experience tides of 1 to 4 cm (0.39 to 1.6 in), but these can be masked by meteorologically induced phenomena such as seiche. The tide in Lake Michigan is described as 1.3 to 3.8 cm (0.5 to 1.5 in) or 4.4 cm (1 3/4 in). This is so small that other larger effects completely mask any tide, and as such these lakes are considered non-tidal.

=== Atmospheric tides ===
Atmospheric tides are negligible at ground level and aviation altitudes, masked by weather's much more important effects. Atmospheric tides are both gravitational and thermal in origin and are the dominant dynamics in the mesosphere and lower thermosphere, about 80 to 120 kilometres (50 to 75 mi), above which the molecular density becomes too low to support fluid behavior.

=== Earth tides ===
Earth tides or terrestrial tides affect the entire Earth's mass, which acts similarly to a liquid gyroscope with a very thin crust. The Earth's crust shifts (in/out, east/west, north/south) in response to lunar and solar gravitation, ocean tides, and atmospheric loading. While negligible for most human activities, terrestrial tides' semi-diurnal amplitude can reach about 55 centimetres (22 in) at the Equator—15 centimetres (5.9 in) due to the Sun—which is important in GPS calibration and VLBI measurements. Precise astronomical angular measurements require knowledge of the Earth's rotation rate and polar motion, both of which are influenced by Earth tides. The semi-diurnal M_{2} Earth tides are nearly in phase with the Moon with a lag in the earth's principal semidiurnal lunar tide of 0.204°±0.047°, corresponding to a time lag of approximately 25 seconds. This implies that the solid tide dissipates at least 110 GW (150,000,000 hp) of tidal power, or about 5% of what the ocean tides dissipate.

=== Galactic tides ===
The tidal forces exerted by galaxies on stars within them and satellite galaxies orbiting them. The galactic tide's effects on the Solar System's Oort cloud are believed to cause 90 percent of long-period comets.

== Misnomers ==
Tsunamis, the large waves that occur after earthquakes, are sometimes called tidal waves, but this name is given by their resemblance to the tide, rather than any causal link to the tide. Other phenomena unrelated to tides but using the word tide are rip tide, storm tide, hurricane tide, and black or red tides. Many of these usages are historic and refer to the earlier meaning of tide as "a portion of time, a season" and "a stream, current or flood".

== In culture ==
Tides have long held cultural as well as scientific significance, shaping mythology, literature, language, and human worldviews. Writers and historians note that the rhythmic rise and fall of the sea has inspired metaphors of time, change, and human experience across traditions, while authors of cultural history have traced how tidal phenomena intersect with folklore and literary expression.

In many ancient societies, before scientific explanations were developed, tidal movements were often explained through cosmology or divine forces, reflecting both reverence and mystery in human understanding of the ocean's rhythms.

Artists and poets across periods have drawn on tidal imagery to explore themes of transformation and reflection. Tides appear in folklore and literary metaphors representing cycles of life, fate, and emotional ebb and flow. The moon's influence appears in coastal ritual practices and seafaring lore, underscoring the interplay between natural rhythms and cultural narratives.

== See also ==
- Aquaculture – Farming of aquatic organisms
- Clairaut's theorem – Theorem about gravity
- Coastal erosion – Displacement of land along the coastline
- Establishment of a port – Measurement in astronomy
- Head of tide, also known as tidal reach, or tidal limit – Furthest point upstream where a river is affected by tidal fluctuations
- Hough function – Mathematical function describing fluid motion
- King tide – Especially high spring tide
- Lunar Laser Ranging experiment – Measuring the distance between the Earth and the Moon with laser light
- Lunar phase – Shape of the Moon's sunlit portion as viewed from Earth
- Raised beach, also known as Marine terrace – Emergent coastal landform
- Mean high water spring – Level of water from which depths displayed on a nautical chart are measured
- Mean low water spring – Level of water from which depths displayed on a nautical chart are measured
- Orbit of the Moon – The Moon's circuit around Earth
- Primitive equations – Equations to approximate global atmospheric flow
- Tidal barrage – Dam-like structure
- Tidal island – Island accessible by foot at low tide
- Tidal locking – Situation in which an astronomical object's orbital period matches its rotational period
- Tidal prism – Volume of water in an estuary or inlet between mean high tide and mean low tide
- Tidal resonance – Enhanced tide due to ocean resonance
- Tidal river – River where flow and level are influenced by tides
- Tidal stream generator – Type of tidal power generation technology
- Tidal triggering of earthquakes – Idea that tidal forces may induce seismicity
- Tide pool – Rocky pool on a seashore, separated from the sea at low tide, filled with seawater
- Tideline – Where two ocean currents converge
- Tides in marginal seas – Dynamics of tidal wave deformation in the shallow waters of the marginal seas
