= Amphidromic point =

Location at which there is little or no tide

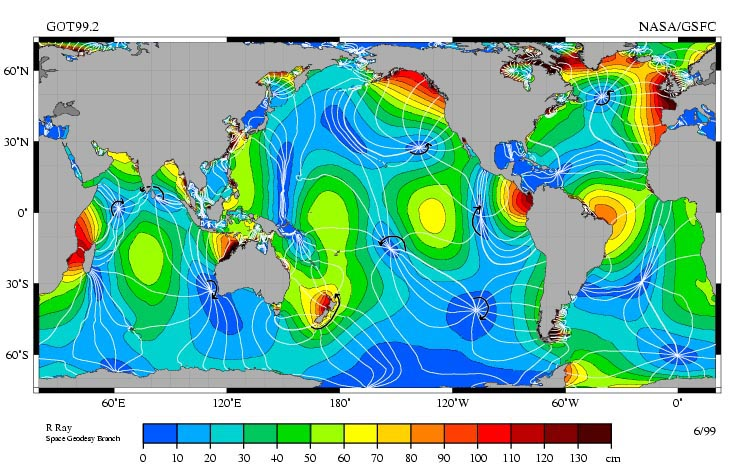
Figure 1. The M_{2} tidal constituent, the amplitude indicated by color. The white lines are cotidal lines spaced at phase intervals of 30° (a bit over 1 hr). The amphidromic points are the dark blue areas where the lines come together.

An amphidromic point, also called a tidal node, is a geographical location where there is little or no difference in sea height between high tide and low tide; it has zero tidal amplitude for one harmonic constituent of the tide. The tidal range (the peak-to-peak amplitude, or the height difference between high tide and low tide) for that harmonic constituent increases with distance from this point, though not uniformly. As such, the concept of amphidromic points is crucial to understanding tidal behaviour. The term derives from the Greek words amphi ("around") and dromos ("running"), referring to the rotary tides which circulate around amphidromic points. It was first discovered by William Whewell, who extrapolated the cotidal lines from the coast of the North Sea and found that the lines must meet at some point.

Amphidromic points occur because interference within oceanic basins, seas and bays, combined with the Coriolis effect, creates a wave pattern — called an amphidromic system — which rotates around the amphidromic point. At the amphidromic points of the dominant tidal constituent, there is almost no vertical change in sea level from tidal action; that is, there is little or no difference between high tide and low tide at these locations. There can still be tidal currents since the water levels on either side of the amphidromic point are not the same. A separate amphidromic system is created by each periodic tidal component.

In most locations the "principal lunar semi-diurnal", known as M_{2}, is the largest tidal constituent. Cotidal lines connect points which reach high tide at the same time and low tide at the same time. In Figure 1, the low tide lags or leads by 1 hr 2 min from its neighboring lines. Where the lines meet are amphidromes, and the tide rotates around them; for example, along the Chilean coast, and from southern Mexico to Peru, the tide propagates southward, while from Baja California to Alaska the tide propagates northward.

== Formation of amphidromic points ==
Tides are generated as a result of gravitational attraction by the Sun and Moon. This gravitational attraction results in a tidal force that acts on the ocean. The ocean reacts to this external forcing by generating, in particular relevant for describing tidal behaviour, Kelvin waves and Poincaré waves (also known as Sverdrup waves). These tidal waves can be considered wide, relative to the Rossby radius of deformation (~3000 km in the open ocean), and shallow, as the water depth (D, on average ~4 kilometre deep) in the ocean is much smaller (i.e. D/λ <1/20) than the wavelength (λ) which is in the order of thousands of kilometres.

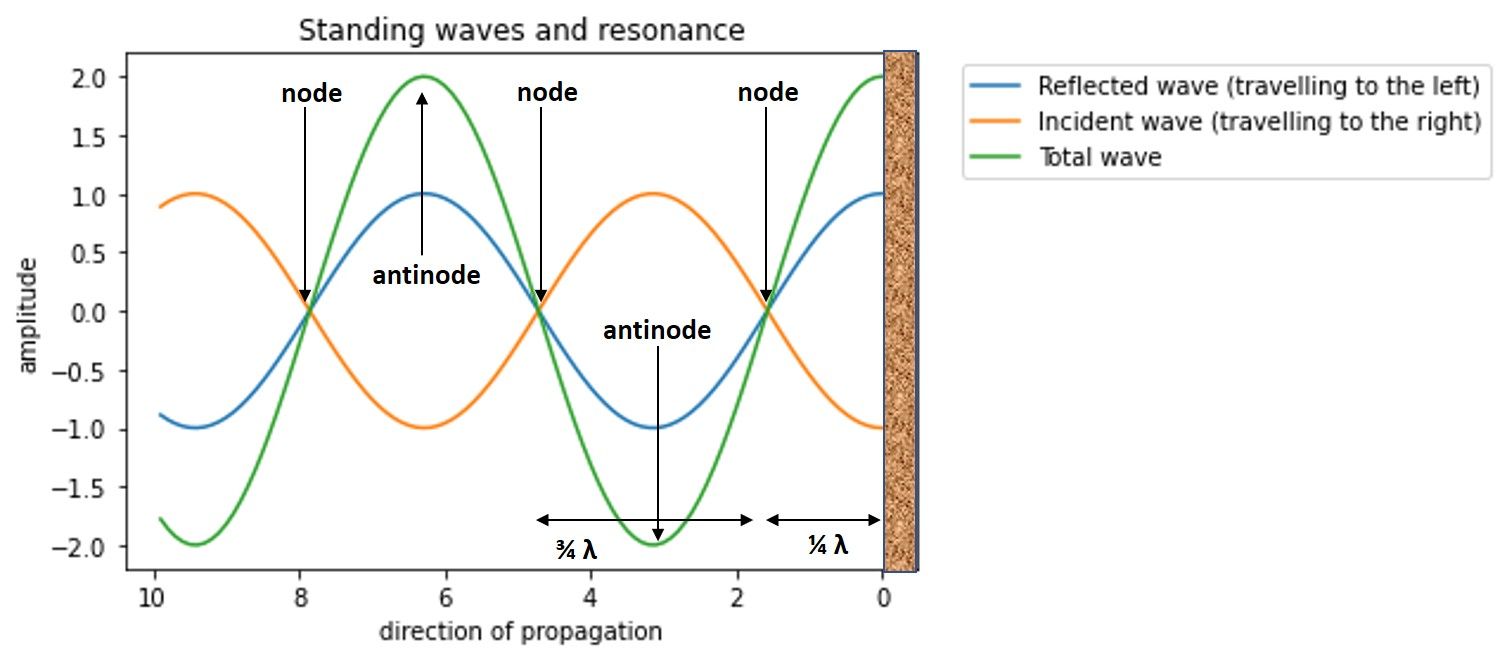
Figure 2. Resonance between an incident and reflected wave and the resulting total wave. At certain points (nodes), the amplitude of the incident wave and the reflected wave cancel each other out. At other points (antinodes), the amplitude of the incident wave and the reflected wave amplify each other. The respective distance between the nodes and antinodes are shown in the bottom right of the Figure and expressed in terms of wavelength.

In real oceans, the tides cannot endlessly propagate as progressive waves. The waves reflect due to changes in water depth (for example when entering shelf seas) and at coastal boundaries. The result is a reflected wave that propagates in the opposite direction to the incident wave. The combination of the reflected wave and the incident wave is the total wave. Due to resonance between the reflected and the incident wave, the amplitude of the total wave can either be suppressed or amplified. The points at which the two waves amplify each other are known as antinodes and the points at which the two waves cancel each other out are known as nodes. Figure 2 shows a 1/4λ resonator. The first node is located at 1/4λ of the total wave, followed by the next node reoccurring 1/2λ farther at 3/4λ.

A long, progressive wave travelling in a channel on a rotating Earth behaves differently from a wave travelling along a non-rotating channel. Due to the Coriolis force, the water in the ocean is deflected towards the right in the northern hemisphere and conversely in the southern hemisphere. This side-way component of the flow due to the Coriolis force causes a build-up of water that results in a pressure gradient. The resulting slope develops until it is equilibrium with the Coriolis force; resulting in geostrophic balance. As a result of this geostrophic balance, Kelvin waves (originally described by Lord Kelvin) and Poincaré waves are generated. The amplitude of a Kelvin wave is highest near the coast and, when considering a wave on the northern hemisphere, decreases to further away from its right-hand coastal boundary. The propagation of Kelvin waves is always alongshore and its amplification falls off according to the Rossby radius of deformation. In contrast, Poincaré waves are able to propagate both alongshore as a free wave with a propagating wave pattern and cross-shore as a trapped wave with a standing wave pattern.

=== Infinitely long channel ===
In an infinitely long channel, which can be viewed upon as a simplified approximation of the Atlantic Ocean and Pacific Ocean, the tide propagates as an incident and a reflective Kelvin wave. The amplitude of the waves decreases further away from the coast and at certain points in the middle of the basin, the amplitude of the total wave becomes zero. Moreover, the phase of the tide seems to rotate around these points of zero amplitude. These points are called amphidromic points. The sense of rotation of the wave around the amphidromic point is in the direction of the Coriolis force; anticlockwise in the northern hemisphere and clockwise in the southern hemisphere.

=== Semi-enclosed basin ===
In a semi-enclosed basin, such as the North Sea, Kelvin waves, though being the dominant tidal wave propagating in alongshore direction, are not able to propagate cross shore as they rely on the presence of lateral boundaries or the equator. As such, the tidal waves observed cross-shore are predominantly Poincaré waves. The tides observed in a semi-enclosed basin are therefore chiefly the summation of the incident Kelvin wave, reflected Kelvin wave and cross-shore standing Poincaré wave. An animation of the tidal amplitude, tidal currents and its amphidromic behaviour is shown in Animation 2.

=== Position of amphidromic points ===
Figure 2 shows that the first node of the total wave is located at 1/4λ with reoccurring nodes at intervals of 1/2λ. In an idealized situation, amphidromic points can be found at the position of these nodes of the total tidal wave. When neglecting friction, the position of the amphidromic points would be in the middle of the basin, as the initial amplitude and the amplitude decay of the incident wave and the reflected wave are equal, this can be seen in Animations 1 and 2 However, tidal waves in the ocean are subject to friction from the seabed and from interaction with coastal boundaries. Moreover, variation in water depth influences the spacing between amphidromic points.

Firstly, the distance between amphidromic points is dependent on the water depth:

$\lambda=\sqrt{gD}\cdot T$

Where g is the gravitational acceleration, D is the water depth and T is the period of the wave.

Locations with more shallow water depth have their amphidromic points closer to each other as the distance of the interval (1/2λ) of the nodes decreases. Secondly, energy losses due to friction in shallow seas and coastal boundaries result in additional adjustments of the tidal pattern. Tidal waves are not perfectly reflected, resulting in energy loss which causes a smaller reflected wave compared to the incoming wave. Consequently, on the northern hemisphere, the amphidromic point will be displaced from the centre line of the channel towards the left of the direction of the incident wave.

The degree of displacement on the northern hemisphere for the first amphidrome is given by:

$\gamma=-\frac{\sqrt{gD}\cdot\ln\alpha}{2f}$

Where γ is the displacement of the amphidrome from the centre of the channel (γ=0), g is the gravitational acceleration, D is the water depth, f is the Coriolis frequency and α is the ratio between amplitudes of the reflected wave and the incident wave. Because the reflected wave is smaller than the incident wave, α will be smaller than 1 and lnα will be negative. Hence the amphidromic displacement γ is to the left of the incident wave on the northern hemisphere.

Furthermore, a study has shown than there is a pattern of amphidrome movement related to spring-neap cycles in the Irish Sea. The maximum displacement of the amphidrome from the centre coincides with spring tides, whereas the minimum occurs at neaps. During spring tides, more energy is absorbed from the tidal wave compared to neap tides. As a result, the reflection coefficient α is smaller and the displacement of the amphidromic point from the centre is larger. Similar amphidromic movement is expected in other seas where energy dissipation due to friction is high.

It can occur that the amphidromic point moves inland of the coastal boundary. In this case, the amplitude and the phase of the tidal wave will still rotate around an inland point, which is called a virtual or degenerate amphidrome.

=== Amphidromic points and sea level rise ===
The position of amphidromic points and their movement predominantly depends on the wavelength of the tidal wave and friction. As a result of enhanced greenhouse gas emissions, the oceans in the world are becoming subject to sea-level rise. As the water depth increases, the wavelength of the tidal wave will increase. Consequently the position of the amphidromic points located at 1/4λ in semi-enclosed systems will move further away from the cross-shore coastal boundary. Furthermore, amphidromic points will move further away from each other as the interval of 1/2λ increases. This effect will be more pronounced in shallow seas and coastal regions, as the relative water depth increase due to sea-level rise will be larger, when compared to the open ocean. Moreover, the amount of sea-level rise differs per region. Some regions will be subject to a higher rate of sea-level rise than other regions and nearby amphidromic points will be more susceptible to change location. Lastly, sea-level rise results in less bottom friction and therefore less energy dissipation. This causes the amphidromic points to move further away from the coastal boundaries and more towards the centre its channel/basin.

== In the M_{2} tidal constituent ==
Based on Figure 1, there are the following clockwise and anticlockwise amphidromic points:

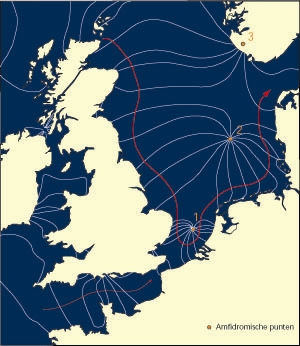
Figure 3. Amphidromic system of the M_{2} constituent in the North Sea. The light-blue lines are lines of equal tidal phase for the vertical tide (surface elevation) along such a line, and the amphidromic points are denoted by 1, 2 and 3.

=== Clockwise amphidromic points ===
- north of the Seychelles
- near Enderby Land
- off Perth
- east of New Guinea
- south of Easter Island
- west of the Galapagos Islands
- north of Queen Maud Land

=== Counterclockwise amphidromic points ===
- near Sri Lanka
- north of New Guinea
- at Tahiti
- between Mexico and Hawaii
- near the Leeward Islands
- east of Newfoundland
- midway between Rio de Janeiro and Angola
- east of Iceland
- Outside Eigersund in southwestern Norway
- The islands of Madagascar and New Zealand are amphidromic points in the sense that the tide goes around them in about 12 and a half hours, but the amplitude of the tides on their coasts is in some places large.

== See also ==
- Kelvin wave
- Tides
- Theory of tides
