= Cotidal line =

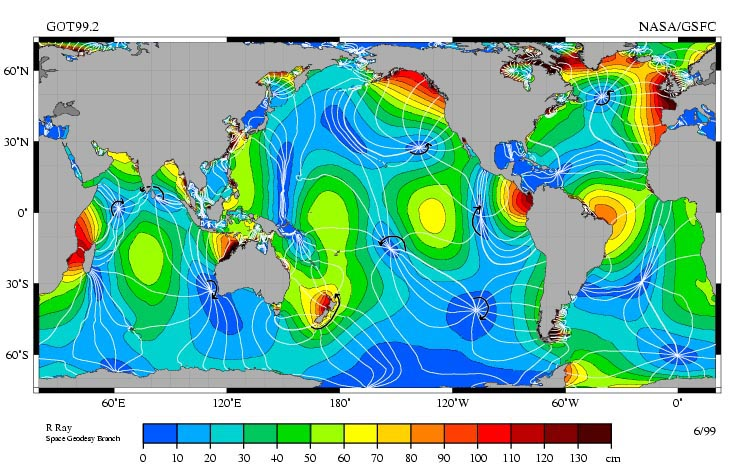
Cotidal lines on an ocean map

Cotidal lines are the set of places where high tide occurs at the same time.

They sometimes all meet at a particular point called the amphidromic point, where the amplitude of the tide is almost null.
