= Tidal resonance =

Enhanced tide due to ocean resonance

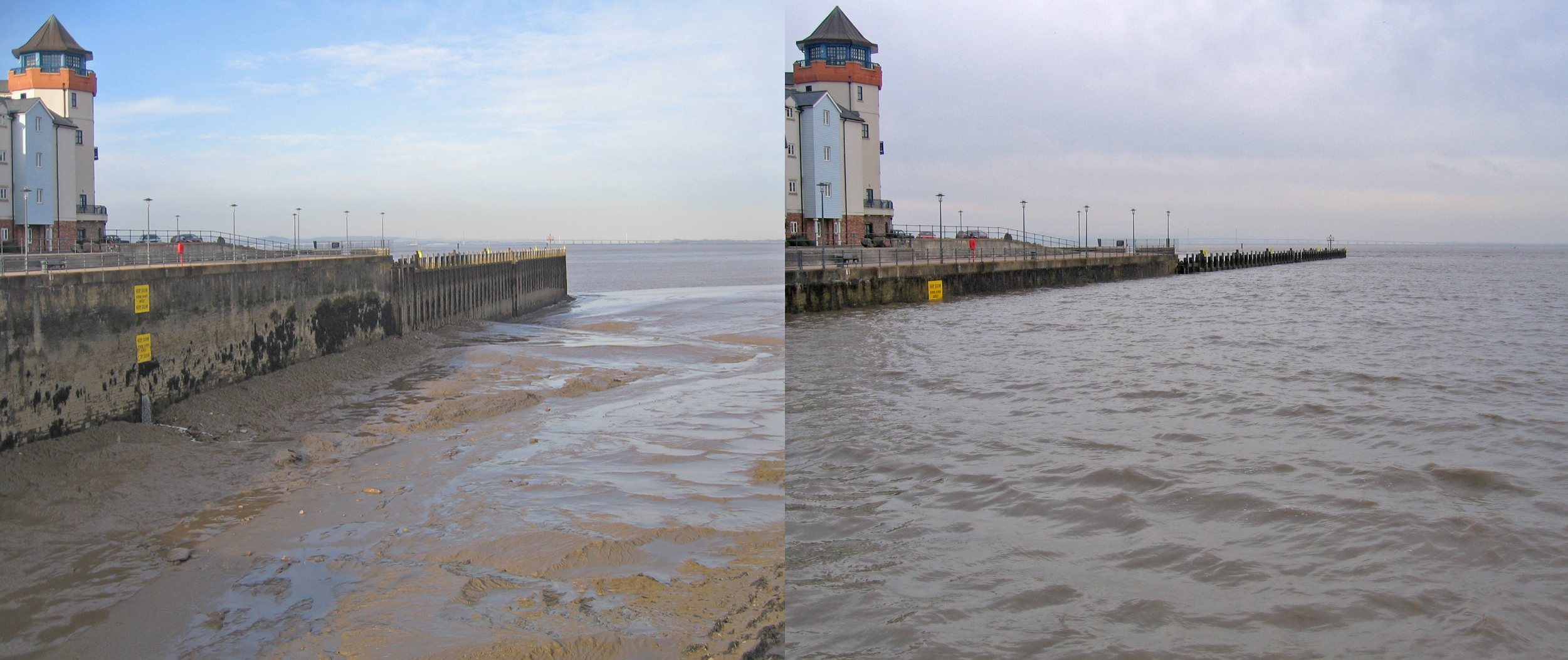
Tides at Portishead Dock in the Bristol Channel. An example of tidal resonance.

In oceanography, a tidal resonance occurs when the tide excites one of the resonant modes of the ocean. The effect is most striking when a continental shelf is about a quarter wavelength wide. Then an incident tidal wave can be reinforced by reflections between the coast and the shelf edge, the result producing a much higher tidal range at the coast.

Famous examples of this effect are found in the Bay of Fundy, where the world's highest tides are reportedly found, and in the Bristol Channel. Less well known is Leaf Bay, part of Ungava Bay near the entrance of Hudson Strait (Canada), which has tides similar to those of the Bay of Fundy. Other resonant regions with large tides include the Patagonian Shelf and on the continental shelf of northwest Australia.

Most of the resonant regions are also responsible for large fractions of the total amount of tidal energy dissipated in the oceans. Satellite altimeter data shows that the M_{2} tide dissipates approximately 2.5 TW, of which 261 GW is lost in the Hudson Bay complex, 208 GW on the European Shelves (including the Bristol Channel), 158 GW on the North-west Australian Shelf, 149 GW in the Yellow Sea and 112 GW on the Patagonian Shelf.

== Scale of the resonances ==
The speed of long waves in the ocean is given, to a good approximation, by $\scriptstyle\sqrt{g h}$, where g is the acceleration of gravity and h is the depth of the ocean. For a typical continental shelf with a depth of 100 m, the speed is approximately 30 m/s. So if the tidal period is 12 hours, a quarter wavelength shelf will have a width of about 300 km.

With a narrower shelf, there is still a resonance but it is mismatched to the frequency of the tides and so has less effect on tidal amplitudes. However the effect is still enough to partly explain why tides along a coast lying behind a continental shelf are often higher than at offshore islands in the deep ocean (one of the additional partial explanations being Green's law). Resonances also generate strong tidal currents and it is the turbulence caused by the currents which is responsible for the large amount of tidal energy dissipated in such regions.

In the deep ocean, where the depth is typically 4000 m, the speed of long waves increases to approximately 200 m/s. The difference in speed, when compared to the shelf, is responsible for reflections at the continental shelf edge. Away from resonance this can reduce tidal energy moving onto the shelf. However near a resonant frequency the phase relationship, between the waves on the shelf and in the deep ocean, can have the effect of drawing energy onto the shelf.

The increased speed of long waves in the deep ocean means that the tidal wavelength there is of order 10,000 km. As the ocean basins have a similar size, they also have the potential of being resonant. In practice deep ocean resonances are difficult to observe, probably because the deep ocean loses tidal energy too rapidly to the resonant shelves.

== See also ==
- Seiche
- Severn Barrage (proposed for the Bristol Channel).
- Standing wave
- Cavity resonator
