= Tidal range =

Vertical difference between the high tide and the succeeding low tide

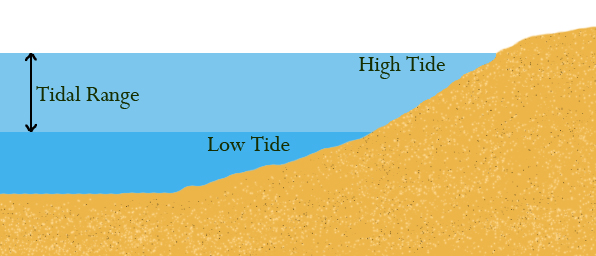

Tidal range is the difference in height between high tide and low tide. Tides are the rise and fall of sea levels caused by gravitational forces exerted by the Moon and Sun, by Earth's rotation and by centrifugal force caused by Earth's progression around the Earth-Moon barycenter. Tidal range depends on time and location.

Larger tidal ranges occur during spring tides (spring range), when the gravitational forces of both the Moon and Sun are aligned (at syzygy), reinforcing each other in the same direction (new moon) or in opposite directions (full moon). The largest annual tidal range can be expected around the time of the equinox if it coincides with a spring tide. Spring tides occur at the second and fourth (last) quarters of the lunar phases.

By contrast, during neap tides, when the Moon and Sun's gravitational force vectors act in quadrature (making a right angle to the Earth's orbit), the difference between high and low tides (neap range) is smallest. Neap tides occur at the first and third quarters of the lunar phases.

Tidal data for coastal areas is published by national hydrographic offices. The data is based on astronomical phenomena and is predictable. Sustained storm-force winds blowing from one direction combined with low barometric pressure can increase the tidal range, particularly in narrow bays. Such weather-related effects on the tide can cause ranges in excess of predicted values and can cause localized flooding. These weather-related effects are not calculable in advance.

Mean tidal range is calculated as the difference between mean high water (i.e., the average high tide level) and mean low water (the average low tide level).

== Geography ==
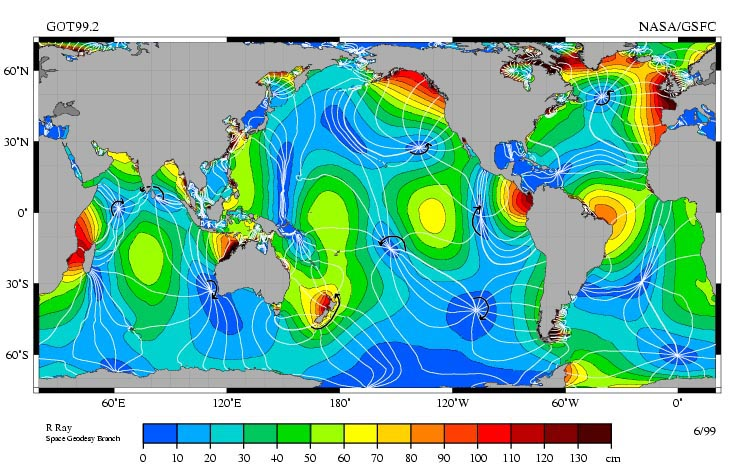
The M_{2} tidal constituent, peak amplitude indicated by color. White lines are cotidal lines spaced at phase intervals of 30° (a bit over 1 hr). Amphidromic points are the dark blue areas where the lines come together. These are amphidromic points, NOT tidal ranges. Tidal ranges can vary from 4 to 10 times what's marked on this map.

The typical tidal range in the open ocean is about 1 metre (3 feet) – mapped in blue and green at right. Mean ranges near coasts vary from near zero to 11.7 metres (38.4 feet), with the range depending on the volume of water adjacent to the coast, and the geography of the basin the water sits in. Larger bodies of water have higher ranges, and the geography can act as a funnel amplifying or dispersing the tide.

The world's largest mean tidal range of 11.7 metres (38.4 feet) occurs in the Bay of Fundy, Canada (more specifically, at Burntcoat Head, Nova Scotia). The next highest, of 9.75 metres (32.0 feet), is at Ungava Bay, also in Canada, and the next, of 9.60 metres (31.5 feet), in the Bristol Channel, between England and Wales. The highest predicted extreme (not mean) range is 17.0 metres (55.8 feet), in the Bay of Fundy. The maximum range in the Bristol Channel is 15 metres (49 feet). The fifty coastal locations with the largest ranges worldwide are listed by the National Oceanic and Atmospheric Administration of the United States.

Some of the smallest tidal ranges occur in the Mediterranean, Baltic, and Caribbean Seas. A point within a tidal system where the tidal range is almost zero is called an amphidromic point.

== Classification ==
The tidal range has been classified as:

- Micro-tidal – when the tidal range is lower than 2 metres (6'6¾").
- Meso-tidal – when the tidal range is between 2 metres and 4 metres (6'6¾" and 13'1½").
- Macro-tidal – when the tidal range is higher than 4 metres (13'1½").

In addition, a handful of coastal systems where the range is greater than 6m have been classed as hypertidal.

== See also ==
- King tide, an informal term for an especially high spring tide
