= Establishment of a port =

Measurement in astronomy

Establishment of a port is the technical expression for the time that elapses between the moon's transit across the local meridian at new or full moon at a given place and the time of the next high water at that place. As an example in the UK, the interval (constant at any one place) may vary from 6 minutes (Harwich) to 11 hours 45 minutes (North Foreland) meaning that the time difference of high water between those two places is 21 minutes. At London Bridge it is 1 hour 58 minutes.

The term establishment of the port is identical to the obsolescent term High Water Full and Change (HWF&C) Full referring to the full moon and change referring to the new moon. Before the creation of modern tide tables, it was a quick way of predicting the time of local high water. The moon’s passage at the local meridian is about 50 minutes later each day. If it is HWF&C 1 hour 30 minutes and we are three days after the full moon, then the morning high water is 1h 30 + 150 minutes = 0400.
