= Inertia–gravity wave =

Wave restored by gravity and the Coriolis force

Inertia–gravity waves (also inertio-gravity waves) are waves in a rotating fluid in which fluid parcels oscillate under the combined action of gravity and the Coriolis force. In a single layer of fluid with a free surface, as described by the shallow water equations, they are also called Poincaré waves, Sverdrup waves, or rotational gravity waves. Inside a stratified fluid they are internal waves, the analog of Poincaré waves. Meteorologists often call them simply gravity waves, with the effects of rotation understood.

The frequency of an inertia–gravity wave is always higher than the Coriolis frequency. Waves much longer than the Rossby radius of deformation behave like inertial oscillations, in which fluid parcels move in circles, and waves much shorter than it behave like gravity waves without rotation.

For a non-rotating fluid, shallow water waves are affected only by gravity (see Gravity wave), where the phase velocity of shallow water gravity wave (c) can be noted as

$$c = (gH)^{1/2}$$

and the group velocity (c_{g}) of shallow water gravity wave can be noted as

$c_\text{g}=(gH)^{1/2}$ i.e. $c=c_\text{g}$

where g is gravity, λ is the wavelength and H is the total depth.

== Terminology ==
The name inertia–gravity wave comes from the two restoring forces that act on a displaced fluid parcel in a rotating, stratified fluid. Gravity on its own gives rise to gravity waves, and rotation on its own to inertial waves. Waves in which both act are inertia–gravity waves. Rotation enters through the Coriolis frequency $f$, which is twice the rate at which the Earth turns about the local vertical. In very long waves, gravity has no effect and fluid parcels move "under their own inertia", which is why $f$ is also called the inertial frequency. Inertial waves need no stratification and have frequencies below $f$, while the frequencies of inertia–gravity waves lie above it. The name is also written inertio-gravity, especially for equatorial waves. (Note: Other forms include inertial gravity wave and gravity–inertia wave.) Inertia–gravity waves with frequencies close to $f$ are called near-inertial waves, and some observational studies call them inertial waves.

In a layer of fluid, the waves also carry the names of Henri Poincaré and Harald Sverdrup, although Kelvin had discussed them first, in 1879. Poincaré included the modes of a channel when he discussed waves in a rotating canal in 1910. Some authors therefore reserve the name Poincaré wave for these channel modes, or for the sum of a plane wave and its reflection from a coast. Others give it to every wave with the same dispersion relation. The plane wave in open water is then often called a Sverdrup wave, apparently after Sverdrup's 1926 analysis of the tides on the North Siberian shelf. There he worked out the properties of such waves on a rotating disc. (Note: The name is also given to long gravity waves modified by friction.) George Platzman, who adopted the name, regarded the plane wave as "an elemental propagator of tidal signals". Adrian Gill objected to telling waves apart by the names of scientists, where for waves without rotation a descriptive term such as "progressive" or "standing" does the job: "a descriptive terminology is much to be preferred".

== Derivation ==
When the fluid is rotating, gravity waves with a long enough wavelength (discussed below) will also be affected by rotational forces. The linearized, shallow-water equations with a constant rotation rate, f_{0}, are

$$\frac{\partial u}{\partial t} - f_0v = -g\frac{\partial h}{\partial x},$$
$$\frac{\partial v}{\partial t} + f_0u = -g\frac{\partial h}{\partial y},$$
$$\frac{\partial h}{\partial t} + H(u_x+v_y) = 0,$$

where u and v are the horizontal velocities and h is the instantaneous height of the free surface. Using Fourier analysis, these equations can be combined to find the dispersion relation for Sverdrup waves:

$$\omega^2 = f_0^2 + gH(k^2 + l^2),$$

where k and l are the wavenumbers associated with the horizontal and vertical directions, and $\omega$ is the frequency of oscillation.

== Limiting Cases ==
There are two primary modes of interest when considering Poincaré waves:

- Short wave limit
  $$(k^2 + l^2) \gg \frac{f_0^2}{gH} \qquad \textrm{or} \qquad (k^2+l^2) \gg L_\text{R}^{-1},$$
  where $L_\text{R} = \frac{(gH)^{1/2}}{f_0}$ is the Rossby radius of deformation. In this limit, the dispersion relation reduces to the solution for a non-rotating gravity wave.
- Long wave limit
  $$(k^2 + l^2) \ll \frac{f_0^2}{gH} \qquad \textrm{or} \qquad (k^2+l^2) \ll L_\text{R}^{-1},$$
  which looks like inertial oscillations driven purely by rotational forces.

=== Solution for the one-dimensional case ===
For a wave traveling in one direction ($l = 0$), the horizontal velocities are found to be equal to

$$u = \frac{\omega}{kH} H_0\cos(kx-\omega t)$$
$$v = \frac{f_0}{kH} H_0\sin(kx-\omega t).$$

This shows that the inclusion of rotation will cause the wave to develop oscillations at 90° to the wave propagation at the opposite phase. In general, these are elliptical orbits that depend on the relative strength of gravity and rotation. In the long wave limit, these are circular orbits characterized by inertial oscillations.

== See also ==
- Kelvin wave
- Rossby wave
- Geophysical fluid dynamics
- Sverdrup
- Harald Sverdrup
