= Navy Operational Global Atmospheric Prediction System Model =

Weather prediction computer model

Navy Operational Global Atmospheric Prediction System Model (NOGAPS) is a global numerical weather prediction computer model run by Fleet Numerical. This mathematical model is run four times a day and produces weather forecasts. Along with the ECMWF's Integrated Forecast System (IFS), the Canadian Global Environmental Multiscale Model (GEM) it is one of several synoptic scale medium-range models in general use.
