= THORPEX Interactive Grand Global Ensemble =

The THORPEX Interactive Grand Global Ensemble (TIGGE) is an implementation of ensemble forecasting for global weather forecasting and is part of THORPEX, an international research programme established in 2003 by the World Meteorological Organization to accelerate improvements in the utility and accuracy of weather forecasts up to two weeks ahead.

== Research ==
TIGGE is a key component of THORPEX, a World Weather Research Programme to accelerate the improvements in the accuracy of 1-day to 2 week high-impact weather forecasts for the benefit of humanity. Centralized archives of ensemble model forecast data, from many international centers, are used to enable extensive data sharing and research.

The Unidata LDM software package is used to transport the ensemble model data from the providers to the archive centers. Currently, the output from the ECMWF, UK Met Office (UKMO), National Centre for Medium Range Weather Forecasting - India (NCMRWF), Indian Meteorological Department (IMD), CMA, Japan Meteorological Agency (JMA), National Centers for Environmental Prediction (NCEP-USA), Meteorological Service of Canada (CMC), Bureau of Meteorology Australia (BOM), Centro de Previsao Tempo e Estudos Climaticos Brazil (CPTEC), Korea Meteorological Administration (KMA), and MeteoFrance (MF) global models, totaling 440 GB/day, is moved at up to 30 GB/hour to NCAR. By requirement the parameter fields, atmospheric levels, and physical units are consistent across all data from the providers and encoded in WMO GRIB-2 format. In contrast, each provider may submit their model output in a resolution they choose.

=== Data availability ===
TIGGE data is available to the public for non-commercial research, with a 48-hour delay after forecast initialization time.

The designated TIGGE archive centre is now at ECMWF via its TIGGE web portal Meteorological Archival and Retrieval System (MARS). It offers fast access to terabytes of data kept online and delayed access to data in the long term archives.

Users can select parameters, grid resolution, and spatial subsets for the most current two-week period. Forecast files are organized by level type (single level, pressure level, potential vorticity level, and potential temperature level), and forecast time-step for a specified model. All ensemble members are included in each forecast file.

== History ==
=== Early discussion ===
TIGGE appears to have been originally envisaged in the THORPEX International Research Implementation Plan (TIP) whose first draft was released on February 14, 2005. In the plan, TIGGE was viewed as a first step towards a Global Interactive Forecasting System (GIFS) (GIFS has still not been made available to the public). According to the plan: "The initial basic components of TIGGE will be global ensembles run to around 14 days, including those run currently at a number of operational centres." (p. 38)

Interactivity was a key component of the original vision. According to the plan: "The concept of interactivity will be tested in the TIGGE framework. As a response to the day to day changes in uncertainty, extra observations could be called on in ‘sensitive areas’, ensemble size and resolution adjusted, and regional ensembles run as and when needed; all these adapting in real time to meet user needs." (p. 38)

The following expected outcomes were listed (pp. 38–39):

- Enhanced collaboration on development of ensemble prediction, internationally and between operational centres and universities
- New methods of combining ensembles from different sources and of correcting for systematic errors (biases)
- Understanding of the feasibility of interactive ensemble system responding dynamically to changing uncertainty (including use for adaptive observing, variable ensemble size, on-demand regional ensembles) and exploiting new technology for grid computing and high-speed data transfer.
- Test (through FDPs) concept of TIGGE Prediction Centre to produce ensemble-based predictions of high-impact weather, wherever it occurs, on all predictable time ranges.
- A prototype future Global Interactive Forecasting System.

=== First workshop ===
The first workshop devoted to setting up TIGGE was held on March 1–3, 2005, at the European Centre for Medium-Range Weather Forecasts (ECMWF). The final report of the workshop laid out a plan for setting up the THORPEX TIGGE-GIFS working group as soon as possible and for setting up the infrastructure for TIGGE over the next few years, in time to contribute to proposed real-time THORPEX support for the International Polar Year field campaigns in 2007-08 and the 2008 Beijing Olympics WWRP Research and Development Project.

=== Progress and research ===
TIGGE was made operational in subsequent years, and can now be accessed through multiple portals including the websites of the European Centre for Medium-Range Weather Forecasts (ECMWF) and the National Center for Atmospheric Research (NCAR) in the United States.

Data from TIGGE has been used in many meteorology papers.

A 2010 review by Bougeault et al. surveyed the past work and future plans of TIGGE, and concluded: "We are convinced that the TIGGE databases will constitute a key resource for reaching the objective of THORPEX: the acceleration of the progress of the forecast skill for severe weather events from 1 day to 2 weeks ahead. This will be reached by a robust combination of research on the scientific basis of ensemble prediction, experimentation with new products, and development of new protocols and policies for data exchange across WMO Member States and across the science and application communities."

Another 2010 paper provided a timeline with 2008-2012 as the development phase for the Global Interactive Forecasting System (GIFS) and 2012 onward as the implementation period.

Some research on TIGGE has compared it with the North American Ensemble Forecasting System (NAEFS) operated jointly by meteorological agencies in Canada, the United States, and Mexico. The research compares the ensembles and considers whether combining them can yield even better forecasts than either one individually.

=== Introduction of TIGGE-LAM ===
In March 2014, the TIGGE-LAM (limited area model) was launched to improve on regional ensemble forecasts.

== Reception ==
=== Academic reception ===
Data from TIGGE has been used in many meteorology papers. The most common subject of the papers referencing TIGGE is tropical cyclones, suggesting that cyclones are an area where having two-week ensembles provides the most marginal value.

Some research on TIGGE has compared it with the North American Ensemble Forecasting System (NAEFS) operated jointly by meteorological agencies in Canada, the United States, and Mexico. The research compares the ensembles and considers whether combining them can yield even better forecasts than either one individually.

== See also ==
- Global Forecast System
- North American Ensemble Forecast System
- Ensemble forecasting
