= Eugenia Kalnay =

Argentine meteorologist (1942–2024)

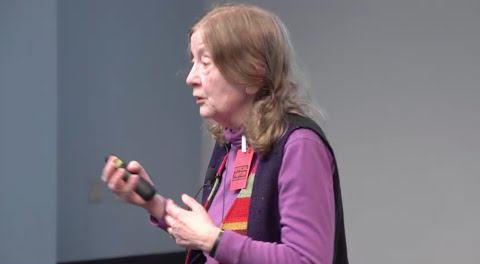
- Kalnay in 2015
- Born: 1 October 1942; Argentina
- Died: 13 August 2024 (aged 81); Maryland, U.S.
- Scientific career
- Fields: Meteorology
- Workplaces: University of Maryland
- Doctoral advisor: Jule Gregory Charney

Eugenia Enriqueta Kalnay (1 October 1942 – 13 August 2024) was an Argentine meteorologist and a Distinguished University Professor of Atmospheric and Oceanic Science, which is part of the University of Maryland College of Computer, Mathematical, and Natural Sciences at the University of Maryland, College Park in the United States.

In 1996, Kalnay was elected a member of the National Academy of Engineering for advances in understanding atmospheric dynamics, numerical modeling, atmospheric predictability, and the quality of U.S. operational weather forecasts.

Kalnay was the recipient of the 54th International Meteorological Organization Prize in 2009 from the World Meteorological Organization for her work on numerical weather prediction, data assimilation, and ensemble forecasting. As Director of the Environmental Modeling Center of the National Centers for Environmental Prediction (NCEP), Kalnay published the 1996 NCEP reanalysis paper entitled "The NCEP/NCAR 40-year reanalysis project", which is one of the most cited papers in the geosciences. She is listed as the author or co-author on over 120 scientific papers and wrote the book Atmospheric Modeling, Data Assimilation and Predictability, which was published by Cambridge University Press in 2003.

== Life and career ==
Kalnay was born in Argentina and received her undergraduate degree in meteorology from the University of Buenos Aires in 1965. In 1971, Kalnay became the first woman to receive a PhD in meteorology from MIT, where she was advised by Jule Charney. She then became the first female professor in the MIT Department of Meteorology. In 1979 she moved to NASA Goddard and in 1984 became Head of the Global Modeling and Simulation Branch at the Goddard Laboratory for Atmospheres. From 1987 to 1997, Kalnay was the Director of the Environmental Modeling Center (EMC) of the National Centers for Environmental Prediction (NCEP), National Weather Service (NWS) and oversaw the NCEP/NCAR reanalysis project and numerous other projects in data assimilation and ensemble forecasting. After leaving NCEP, Kalnay became the Robert E. Lowry Chair of the School of Meteorology at the University of Oklahoma. In 1999, Kalnay joined the Department of Atmospheric and Oceanic Science at the University of Maryland, College Park and served as department chair.

Along with James A. Yorke, she co-founded the Weather/Chaos Group at the University of Maryland, which has made discoveries of the local, low-dimensionality of unstable atmospheric regions and the development of the Local Ensemble Kalman filter and Local Ensemble Transform Kalman Filter data assimilation methods. In addition to the Atmospheric and Ocean Department (AOSC), Kalnay had appointments in the Institute for Physical Science and Technology (IPST) and the Center for Computational Science and Mathematical Modeling (CSCAMM), also at the University of Maryland, College Park. In 2008, she was selected as the first Eugenia Brin Endowed Professorship in Data Assimilation.

Among the scientific methods, Kalnay pioneered the breeding method, introduced, along with Zoltan Toth, as a method to identify the growing perturbations in a dynamical system. She was also a co-author on papers introducing the ensemble methods of Lag Averaged Forecasting (LAF) and Scaled LAF (with Ross N. Hoffman and Wesley Ebisuzaki).

In 2017, Kalnay was part of an international team of distinguished scientists who published a study on climate change models in the National Science Review journal. The study argues that crucial components are missing from current climate models that inform about environmental, climatic, and economic policies. Kalnay observed that without including real feedback, predictions for coupled systems could not work, and the model can get away from reality very quickly.

Kalnay died on 13 August 2024, at the age of 81.

== Positions ==
Kalnay was a fellow of the American Geophysical Union, the American Meteorological Society, the American Association for the Advancement of Science, and the American Academy of Arts and Sciences. She was a member of the National Academy of Engineering (1996), a foreign member of the Academia Europaea (2000), and a member of the Argentine National Academy of Physical Sciences (2003).

== Awards ==
Kalnay received several significant awards, including:

- American Meteorological Society The Jagadish Shukla Earth System Predictability Prize (2024), for contributions to Earth system predictability through the development of data assimilation techniques with profound leadership and vision in the creation of the NCEP/NCAR Reanalysis
- American Geophysical Union's Roger Revelle Medal (2019)
- American Meteorological Society Eugenia Kalnay Symposium (2015)
- American Meteorological Society Honorary Member Award (2015)
- American Meteorological Society Joanne Simpson Mentorship Award (2015)
- Lorenz Lecturer (2012), a lecture named after Edward Lorenz and presented at the American Geophysical Union Fall Meeting
- 54th International Meteorological Organization Prize (2009) from the World Meteorological Organization
- Doctor Honoris Causa, University of Buenos Aires (2008)
- First Eugenia Brin Professorship in Data Assimilation (2008)
- Distinguished University Professor, University of Maryland (2001)
- Bjerknes Lecturer (1999), an American Geophysical Union lecture named after Jacob Bjerknes
- American Meteorological Society Jule G. Charney Award (1995)
- National Aeronautics and Space Administration gold medal for Exceptional Scientific Achievement (1981)
