= North American Ensemble Forecast System =

The North American Ensemble Forecast System (NAEFS) is a joint project involving the Meteorological Service of Canada (MSC) in Canada, the National Weather Service (NWS) in the United States, and the National Meteorological Service of Mexico (NMSM) in Mexico providing numerical weather prediction ensemble guidance for the 1- to 16-day forecast period. The NAEFS combines the Canadian MSC (Global Environmental Multiscale Model) and the US NWS global ensemble prediction systems (Global Forecast System), improving probabilistic operational guidance over what can be built from any individual country's ensemble. Model guidance from the NAEFS is incorporated into the forecasts of the respective national agencies.

NAEFS operates on the fundamental principles of ensemble forecasting which provides a range of possible weather forecasts of the atmospheric state over a given forecast period. The initial state of the atmosphere and/or the numerical weather prediction model configuration are slightly varied to provide a range of possible forecast solutions. The global ensemble prediction systems at MSC and NWS use slightly different, but equally valid methods to initialize and integrate the atmospheric state. By combining the ensembles from both centers into one ensemble, the possible range of future atmospheric states for a given forecast period are better sampled, producing on average, improved estimates of the future atmospheric state and the associated uncertainty. NAEFS collaboration allows the national weather agencies to pool their research resources and make improvements to the ensemble prediction systems more quickly and efficiently. The exchange of knowledge allows research and operations to develop a new generation of ensemble products with the goal of improving timeliness and accuracy in alerting the public of high impact weather events.

== History ==
Officials from the MSC and the NWS first met in February 2003 to discuss building a joint ensemble prediction system. In May 2003, weather modeling experts from Canada and the U.S. held a workshop to start planning the research, development, and operational implementation of the NAEFS. The initial NAEFS development plan was completed in October 2003. Intensive work for the Initial Operational Capability implementation then began, and was successfully completed on schedule in September 2004. NAEFS was launched in November 2004 in the presence of representatives of the three countries.

== Technical details ==
The NAEFS constituent ensemble prediction systems and post-processing techniques are continually upgraded to include improved scientific understanding of atmospheric phenomenon, advances in computational methods, and advances in computing, among other reasons. Implementation changes to the NWS global ensemble prediction system (GEFS), global forecast model (GFS) configuration and NWS NAEFS post-processed products can be found at the NWS National Centers for Environmental Prediction Central Operations website. The NWS provides global and downscaled (CONUS and Alaska) and MSC provides global post-processed model guidance on various standard pressure-levels.

NAEFS configuration as of April 2016
	NAEFS
Models	NWS Global Forecasting System (GFS) + MSC Global Environmental Multiscale Model (GEM)
Daily Frequency	0000 UTC and 1200 UTC
Forecast Length	16 days
Initial Condition Uncertainty	Ensemble Kalman Filter (EnKF)
Control	1 NWS + 1 MSC
Ensemble Members	40 (20 NWS + 20 MSC) for each cycle
Post-Processed Probabilistic Products	mean, mode, standard deviation, and probabilities (10%, 50%, 90%)
Post-Processed Probabilistic Product Resolution	NWS/MSC: 1° x 1° global products NWS: downscaled CONUS 2.5 km, Alaska 3 km

== Research use ==
NAEFS has been the subject of meteorological research. A few such research studies have compared NAEFS with the THORPEX Interactive Grand Global Ensemble (TIGGE), a part of THORPEX, an initiative of the World Meteorological Organization to determine whether combining them can yield even better forecasts than either one individually.

== See also ==
- Global Forecast System
- Global Environmental Multiscale Model
- THORPEX Interactive Grand Global Ensemble
