= Edward Epstein =

Edward Epstein may refer to:

- Edward Jay Epstein (1935–2024), American investigative journalist
- Edward Epstein (meteorologist) (1931–2008), American meteorologist
- Jeffrey Edward Epstein (1953–2019), American financier and child sex offender
