= Bred vector =

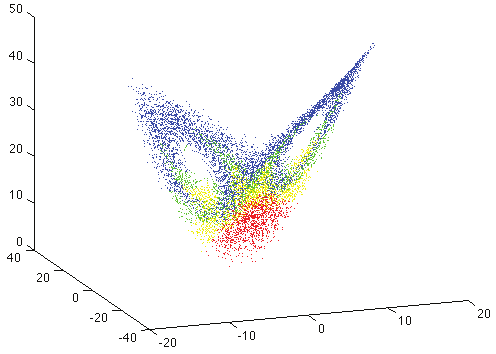
The growth rates of bred vectors in the Lorenz system. Red indicates the fastest-growing bred vectors while blue the slowest.

In applied mathematics, bred vectors are perturbations related to Lyapunov vectors, that capture fast-growing dynamical instabilities of the solution of a numerical model. They are used, for example, as initial perturbations for ensemble forecasting in numerical weather prediction. They were introduced by Zoltan Toth and Eugenia Kalnay.

== Method ==
Bred vectors are created by adding initially random perturbations to a nonlinear model. The control (unperturbed) and the perturbed models are integrated in time, and periodically the control solution is subtracted from the perturbed solution. This difference is the bred vector. The vector is scaled to be the same size as the initial perturbation and is then added back to the control to create the new perturbed initial condition. After a short transient period, this "breeding" process creates bred vectors dominated by the naturally fastest-growing instabilities of the evolving control solution.
