= Global Forecast System =

Global meteorological forecasting mathematical model

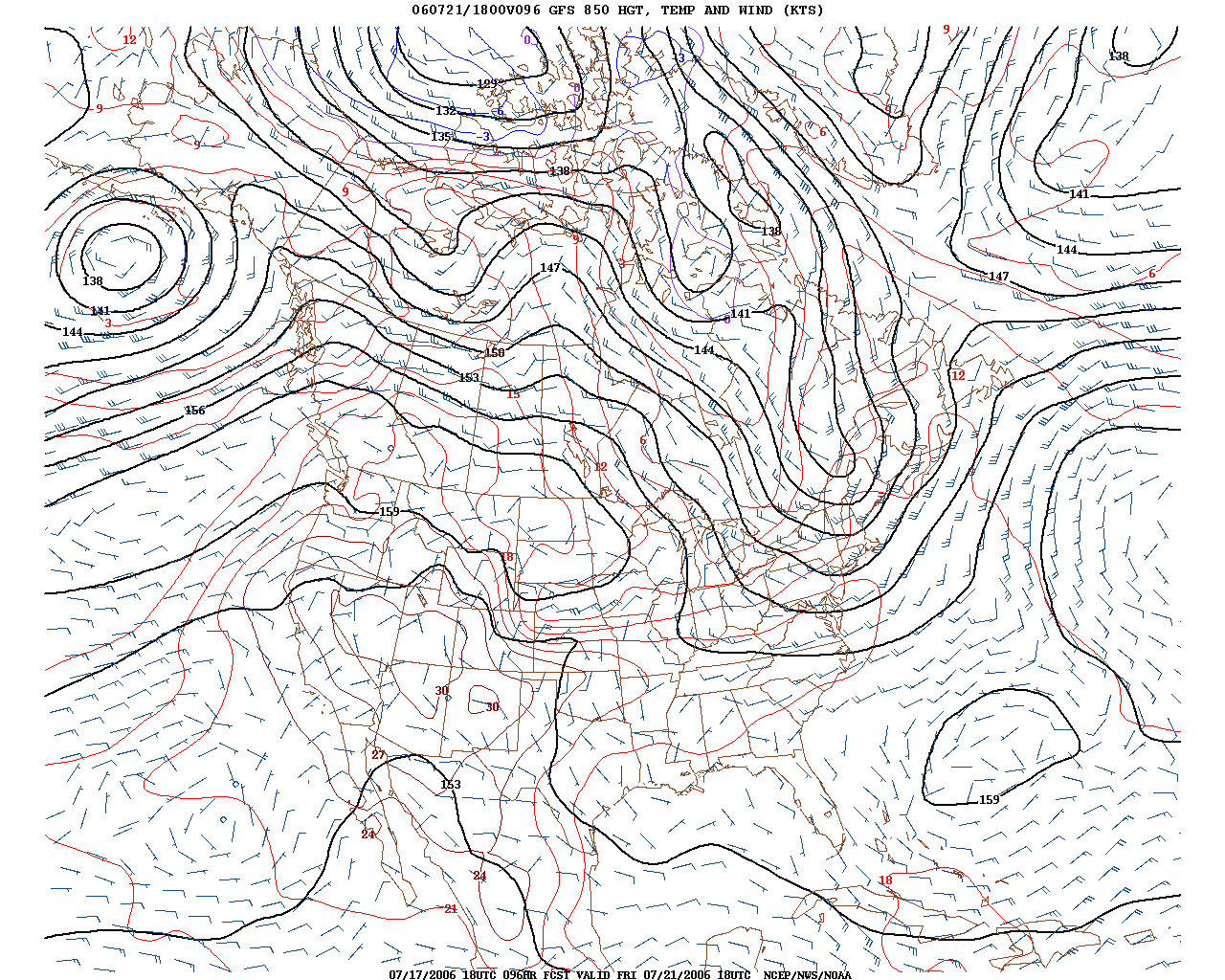
An example of a forecast product from the GFS, in this case a 96-hour forecast of 850 mb geopotential height and temperature

The Global Forecast System (GFS) is a global numerical weather prediction system containing a global computer model and variational analysis run by the United States' National Weather Service (NWS).

== Operation ==
The mathematical model is run four times a day, and produces forecasts for up to 16 days in advance, but with decreased spatial resolution after 10 days. The forecast skill generally decreases with time (as with any numerical weather prediction model) and for longer term forecasts, only the larger scales retain significant accuracy. It is one of the predominant synoptic scale medium-range models in general use.

=== Principles ===
The GFS model has a finite volume cubed sphere (FV3) dynamical core with an approximate horizontal resolution of 28 km between grid points, which drops to 70 km between grid points for forecasts between one and two weeks. In the vertical, the model is divided into 127 layers and extends to the mesopause (roughly ~80 km). It produces forecast output every hour for the first 120 hours, three hourly through day 10, and 12 hourly through day 16. The output from the GFS is also used to produce model output statistics.

=== Variants ===
In addition to the main model, the GFS is also the basis of a lower-resolution 30-member (31, counting the control and operational members) ensemble that runs concurrently with the operational GFS and is available on the same time scales. This ensemble is referred to as the "Global Ensemble Forecast System" (GEFS). The GFS ensemble is combined with Canada's Global Environmental Multiscale Model ensemble to form the North American Ensemble Forecast System (NAEFS).

== Usage ==
As with most works of the U.S. government, GFS data is not copyrighted and is available for free in the public domain under provisions of U.S. law. Because of this, the model serves as the basis for the forecasts of numerous private, commercial, and foreign weather companies.

== Accuracy ==
By 2015, the GFS model had fallen behind the accuracy of other global weather models. This was most notable in the GFS model incorrectly predicting Hurricane Sandy turning out to sea until four days before landfall, while the European Centre for Medium-Range Weather Forecasts' model predicted landfall correctly at 7 days. Much of this was suggested to be due to limits in computational resources within the National Weather Service. In response, the NWS purchased new supercomputers, increasing processing power from 776 teraflops to 5.78 petaflops.

As of the 12z run on 19 July 2017, the GFS model has been upgraded. Unlike the recently upgraded ECMWF, the new GFS behaves a bit differently in the tropics and in other regions compared to the previous version. This version accounts more accurately for variables such as the Madden–Julian oscillation and the Saharan Air Layer.

In 2018, the processing power was increased again to 8.4 petaflops, The agency also tested a potential replacement model with different mechanics, the flow-following, finite-volume icosahedral model (FIM), in the early 2010s; it abandoned that model around 2016, after it did not show substantial improvement over the GFS.

In 2019, a major upgrade was held for the GFS, converting it from the GSM (Global Spectral Model) to the new FV3 dycore. Horizontal and vertical resolution remained the same but this set the foundation for what is now known as the UFS (Unified Forecast System). On March 22, 2021, the NOAA upgraded the GFS model, coupling it with the WaveWatch III global wave model, which will increase the GFS's resolution from 64 to 127 vertical levels, while extending the WaveWatch III forecasting window from 10 to 16 days. This left some meteorologists hopeful that the GFSv16 upgrade would be enough to close the accuracy gap with the ECMWF's model, which was considered to be the most accurate global weather model at the time.

== Upgraded dynamical core ==
On June 12, 2019, after several years of testing, NOAA upgraded the GFS with a new dynamical core, the GFDL Finite-Volume Cubed-Sphere Dynamical Core (FV3), which uses the finite volume method instead of the spectral method used by earlier versions of the GFS. The resulting model, initially developed under the name FV3GFS, inherited the GFS moniker, with the legacy GFS continuing to be run until September 2019. Initial testing of the FV3-based GFS showed promise, improving upon the large-scale prediction skill and hurricane track accuracy of the legacy GFS.

== Planned improvements ==
With the initial operational implementation of FV3GFS now accomplished, NOAA's Environmental Modeling Center (EMC) global modeling focus has turned towards development of the next GFS v16 upgrade, which will include doubled vertical resolution, 64 to 127 layers, more advanced physics, data assimilation system upgrades, and coupling to a NCEP's Global Wave Model using the Unified Forecast System (UFS) community model. GFSv16 was implemented on March 22, 2021.

On 23 September 2020, the first global UFS application at NCEP was implemented in the Global Ensemble Forecast System (GEFS v12). The components of this upgrade include:

- Use of the FV3 global model - same version as GFS v15, as the atmospheric component of the GEFS
- Increase in horizontal resolution to ~25 km
- Forecast length increased from 10 to 16 days
- Increased from 21 to 31 members
- Coupling the GEFS atmospheric component to the NCEP Global Wave model
- Run a 32nd member to 5 days (GEFS-Aero) for aerosol prediction, inline aerosol representation based on GOCART (GSD-Chem).

This implementation is the first global-scale coupled system at NCEP and replaces previous standalone Global Wave Ensemble and the NEMS GFS Aerosol Component (NGAC) systems. More details can be found at the EMC Model Evaluation Group’s GEFS v12 web site, the EMC GEFS web page, and the EMC GEFS-Aerosol web page.

== See also ==
- Integrated Forecast System – The ECMWF's global weather forecasting system (the "European Model")
- Weather Research and Forecasting Model
- Numerical weather prediction
- Ensemble forecasting
- Rapid Refresh (weather prediction)
- North American Mesoscale Model
- Geostationary Operational Environmental Satellite
- NEXRAD - network of weather radars ran by the National Weather Service
