= Global Environmental Multiscale Model =

Weather forecasting and data assimilation system

The Global Environmental Multiscale Model (GEM), often known as the CMC model in North America, is an integrated forecasting and data assimilation system developed in the Recherche en Prévision Numérique (RPN), Meteorological Research Branch (MRB), and the Canadian Meteorological Centre (CMC). Along with the NWS's Global Forecast System (GFS), which runs out to 16 days, the ECMWF's Integrated Forecast System (IFS), which runs out 10 days, the US Naval Research Laboratory Navy Global Environmental Model (NAVGEM), which runs out eight days, the UK Met Office's Unified Model, which runs out to seven days, and Deutscher Wetterdienst's ICON (ICOsahedral Nonhydrostatic), which runs out to 7.5 days, it is one of the global medium-range models in general use.

== Operation ==
=== Deterministic model ===
The GEM's operational model, known as the Global Deterministic Prediction System (GDPS), is currently operational for the global data assimilation cycle and medium-range forecasting, the regional data assimilation spin-up cycle and short-range forecasting. Mesoscale forecasts (distributed under the names regional deterministic prediction system or RDPS for the coarser mesh, available for all of North America and high-resolution deterministic prediction system or HRDPS for the finer mesh, available in Canada only) are produced overnight and are available to the operational forecasters. A growing number of meteorological applications are now either based on or use the GEM model. Output from the GEM goes out to 10 days, on par with the public output of the European Integrated Forecast System.

=== Ensemble model ===
The ensemble variant of the GEM is known as the Global Ensemble Prediction System (GEPS). It has 20 members (plus control) and runs out 16 days, the same range as the American global forecast system. The GEPS runs alongside the GFS ensemble to form the North American Ensemble Forecast System. A regional ensemble prediction system (REPS), covering North America and also having 20 members plus control, runs out 72 hours.

== Development ==
The GEM model has been developed to meet the operational weather forecasting needs of Canada for the coming years. These presently include short-range regional forecasting, medium-range global forecasting, and data assimilation. In the future they will include nowcasting at the meso-scales, and dynamic extended-range forecasting on monthly to seasonal timescales. The essence of the approach is to develop a single highly efficient model that can be reconfigured at run time to either run globally at uniform-resolution (with possibly degraded resolution in the "other" hemisphere), or to run with variable resolution over a global domain such that high resolution is focused over an area of interest.

=== Mechanics ===
The operational GEM model dynamics is formulated in terms of the hydrostatic primitive equations with a terrain following pressure vertical coordinate (h). The time discretization is an implicit two-time-level semi-Lagrangian scheme. The spatial discretization is a Galerkin grid-point formulation on an Arakawa C-grid in the horizontal (lat-lon) and the staggered Charney-Phillips Vertical discretization. The horizontal mesh can be of uniform or variable resolution, and furthermore can be arbitrarily rotated, the vertical mesh is also variable. The explicit horizontal diffusion is -2 on all prognostic variables.

The operational GEM model is interfaced with a full complement of physical parametrizations, these currently include:

- solar and infrared radiation interactive with water vapor, carbon dioxide, ozone and clouds,
- prediction of surface temperature over land with the force-restore method,
- turbulence in the planetary boundary layer through vertical diffusion, diffusion coefficients based on stability and turbulent kinetic energy,
- surface layer based on Monin–Obukhov similarity theory,
- shallow convection scheme (non precipitating),
- Kuo-type deep convection scheme (global forecast system),
- Fritsch–Chappell type deep convection scheme (regional forecast system),
- Sundqvist condensation scheme for stratiform precipitation,
- Gravity wave drag.

=== Future ===
The next stage of development of the GEM model is to evaluate the non-hydrostatic version for mesoscale applications where the hydrostatic assumption breaks down. The limited-area (open-boundary) version is scheduled to follow. The distributed memory version of GEM is almost completed, it is a major recoding effort that is based upon a locally developed communication interface currently using Message Passing Interface. Research on the performance of different land surface schemes such as ISBA (Interaction Soil-Biosphere-Atmosphere) and CLASS (Canadian Land Surface Scheme) is making progress.

The strategy is progressing towards a unified data assimilation and forecast system, at the heart of which lies a single multipurpose and multiscale numerical model.

== Usage ==
Output from Canadian forecast models such as the GEM is under Canadian crown copyright but is issued under a free license if properly attributed to Environment Canada. Various unofficial sites thus redistribute GEM data, including the GDPS and GEPS.

== See also ==
- Global climate model
