= THORPEX =

Meteorological research programme

THORPEX (The Observing System Research and Predictability Experiment) is an international research programme established in 2003 by the World Meteorological Organization (WMO) to accelerate improvements in the utility and accuracy of weather forecasts up to two weeks ahead. It is part of the World Weather Research Programme and is a key component of the WMO Natural Disaster Reduction and Mitigation Programme.

== History ==
THORPEX was started in 2003 with the intention of being a ten-year programme, but it continues to be active as of 2014. The 12th annual session was held at the WMO headquarters in Geneva, Switzerland in March 2014.

=== Creation and International Science Plan (2003-04) ===
THORPEX was created in 2003 at the Fourteenth World Meteorological Congress under the auspices of the WMO Commission for Atmospheric Sciences (CAS) as a ten-year international research and development programme to accelerate improvements in the accuracy and the social, economic & environmental benefits of 1-day to 2-week high-impact weather forecasts.

At the time of its creation, the following sub-programmes were listed in the THORPEX International Science Plan:

1. Global-to-regional influences on the evolution and predictability of weather systems
2. Global observing-system design and demonstration
3. Targeting and assimilation of observations
4. Societal, economic & environmental benefits of improved forecasts

=== International Research Implementation Plan (TIP) and the creation of TIGGE ===
In February 2005, the THORPEX International Research Implementation Plan (TIP) was published. This plan proposed the creation of the THORPEX Interactive Grand Global Ensemble (TIGGE), an implementation of ensemble forecasting, and the Global Interactive Forecasting System (GIFS).

In early March 2005, the first workshop devoted to TIGGE was held. The final report of the workshop laid out a plan for setting up the THORPEX TIGGE-GIFS working group as soon as possible & for setting up the infrastructure for TIGGE over the next few years, in time to contribute to proposed real-time THORPEX support for the International Polar Year field campaigns in 2007-08 & the 2008 Beijing Olympics WWRP Research and Development Project.

=== Further progress ===
TIGGE was developed and made operational over the coming years, and data from TIGGE was used in many meteorological research papers.

A 2010 review by Bougeault et al. surveyed the past work and future plans of TIGGE and concluded: "We are convinced that the TIGGE databases will constitute a key resource for reaching the objective of THORPEX: the acceleration of the progress of the forecast skill for severe weather events from 1 day to 2 weeks ahead. This will be reached by a robust combination of research on the scientific basis of ensemble prediction, experimentation with new products, and development of new protocols and policies for data exchange across WMO Member States and across the science and application communities."

Another 2010 paper provided a timeline with 2008-2012 as the development phase for the Global Interactive Forecasting System (GIFS) and 2012 onward as the implementation period.

In March 2014, the TIGGE-LAM (limited area model) was launched to improve on regional ensemble forecasts.

== Components ==
=== TIGGE ===
The THORPEX Interactive Grand Global Ensemble, also known as TIGGE, was envisaged in the February 2005 THORPEX International Research Implementation Plan, and the groundwork for it was laid in a 2005 workshop. Its goal is to improve ensemble forecasting for the weather worldwide.

Currently, the TIGGE data is available from these sources:

- The European Centre for Medium-Range Weather Forecasts (ECMWF)
- The National Center for Atmospheric Research (NCAR) in the United States
- The China Meteorological Administration (CMA) is also supposed to host a copy of TIGGE

A review of TIGGE was published in 2010. In March 2014, the TIGGE-LAM (limited area model) was launched to improve on regional ensemble forecasts.

=== GIFS ===
The Global Interactive Forecasting System (GIFS) was first described in the THORPEX International Research Implementation Plan (TIP) published in February 2005, and it has since been mentioned in discussions of TIGGE as part of the next step in the evolution of ensemble forecasting after TIGGE. However, GIFS does not have a public-facing implementation as of April 2014.
