= African Centre of Meteorological Application for Development =

African weather office based in Niger

- Abbreviation: ACMAD
- Formation: 1987
- Website: www.acmad.ne www.acmad.net

The African Centre of Meteorological Application for Development (shortened as ACMAD) is an African weather office based in Niamey, Niger.

It was established in 1987 by the UNECA and the WMO. It has 53 member countries and cooperates with WMO, EUMETSAT and ECMWF.
