= Integrated Forecasting System =

Global numerical weather prediction system

The Integrated Forecasting System (IFS) is a global numerical weather prediction system jointly developed and maintained by the European Centre for Medium-Range Weather Forecasts (ECMWF) based in Reading, England, and Météo-France based in Toulouse. The version of the IFS run at ECMWF is often referred to as the "ECMWF" or the "European model" in North America, to distinguish it from the American Global Forecast System.

== Mechanism ==
It comprises a spectral atmospheric model with a terrain-following vertical coordinate system coupled to a 4D-Var data assimilation system. In 1997 the IFS became the first operational forecasting system to use 4D-Var. Both ECMWF and Météo-France use the IFS to make operational weather forecasts, but using a different configuration and resolution (the Météo-France configuration is referred to as ARPEGE). It is one of the predominant global medium-range models in general use worldwide; its most prominent rivals in the 6–10 day medium range include the American Global Forecast System (GFS), the Canadian Global Environmental Multiscale Model (GEM and GDPS) and the UK Met Office's Unified Model.

=== Variants ===
ECMWF runs the IFS in several configurations. The highest resolution "HRES" configuration is run every 6 hours (00Z and 12Z out to 10 days, 06Z/18Z out to 90 hours) with a horizontal resolution of 9 km using 137 layers in the vertical. The 51-member ensemble system "ENS" is also run every twelve hours out to 15 days and every 06Z/18Z out to 6 days with a horizontal resolution of 18 km and 137 layers in the vertical. The ECMWF also runs a coarser version of the IFS out 45 days; this version is run weekly, with output in five-day intervals. There is also a version that runs out one year. All model versions except HRES are coupled to the ocean model NEMO.

== Usage ==
Many ECMWF member states use ECMWF global forecasts to provide boundary conditions for their own higher resolution, limited domain forecasts. ECMWF forecasts are free to the national weather services of its member states, but a fee is charged to commercial users, while limited operational data (select variables from the HRES and ENS out ten days) is available direct to consumers under the noncommercial Creative Commons license prohibiting derivative works (CC-BY ND NC). In contrast to the international organization's forecast, the output of many national weather services is usually freely licensed to all users.

The full IFS source code is available only to the national weather services of ECMWF member states,. The source code for the atmosphere model is available to other non-commercial users in the form of the OpenIFS which requires a free license. The EC-Earth climate model is based on the IFS.
