= Centro de Previsão do Tempo e Estudos Climáticos =

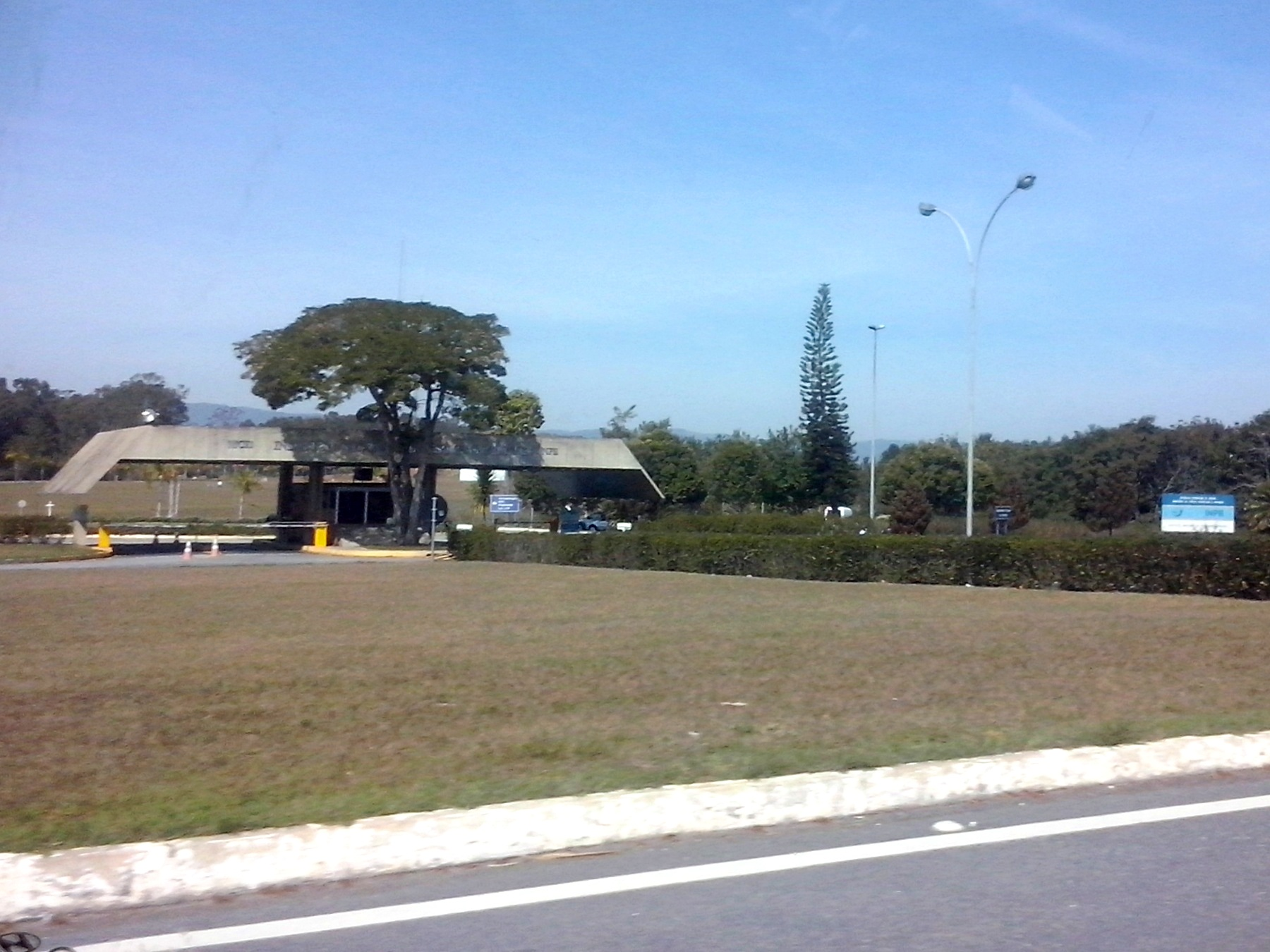
- Entrance of the Center in São Paulo.

Agency overview
- Formed: 1995; 31 years ago
- Jurisdiction: Brazilian Government
- Headquarters: Cachoeira Paulista, São Paulo, Brazil
- Parent agency: National Institute for Space Research
- Website: www.cptec.inpe.br

Centro de Previsão do Tempo e Estudos Climáticos (CPTEC, Portuguese for Center for Weather Forecast and Climatic Studies) is the numerical weather prediction agency of Brazil, part of INPE (National Institute for Space Research). Its mission is to provide Brazil with weather and climate forecasts. CPTEC is the most advanced center for numerical weather prediction and climate in Latin America, providing forecasts for short and medium-term climate and high precision, since the beginning of 1995. CPTEC uses supercomputers and the knowledge of its staff to achieve the same level as forecasting centers in more developed countries.

CPTEC receives information through the data network of the World Meteorological Organization and other national networks, in addition to the Brazilian satellite (SCD-1). In addition, the cluster manufactured by Sun Microsystems, with a processing capacity of 5.7 trillion operations per second, enables simulation with numerical models of weather and climate, integrating atmospheric and oceanic information. In activity until 2009, in 2010 a Cray XE6 supercomputer (31,104 cores) was purchased from Cray Inc. with a performance of 214.2 TFLOP/s, dubbed "Tupã".
