= Leith AGCM =

Climate model

Leith AGCM is a climate model that was developed by Cecil Leith beginning in 1958; it is likely the oldest atmospheric general circulation model. Leith published videos of its model output, inspiring other scientists to do the same. Today it has been superseded by climate models developed from different base codes; as such, it is little known.

== History and development ==
Efforts to calculate the behaviour of the weather system commenced in the 1920s with a seminal paper by Lewis Fry Richardson. By the 1950s and 1960s several groups were involved in making climate models, with major efforts taking place at several US universities that eventually gave rise to the well-known GFDL, UCLA, and NCAR models. Today climate models are an important enterprise with significant impact on public policy, where hundreds of scientists and institutions participate worldwide.

The researcher Cecil E. “Chuck” Leith (1923–2016) is well-known for his research on fluid mechanics. After an initial career on the Manhattan Project, which resulted in the invention of nuclear bombs, he joined the Lawrence Radiation Laboratory after 1946 and in 1968 the National Center for Atmospheric Research. Beginning in 1958, he began to work on a climate model that was later named the "Leith atmospheric model" or "Livermore atmospheric model". Its existence was barely reported at that time, with only several contemporary journal articles mentioning it. According to interviews with Leith, he was inspired to work on climate modelling by the noted scientist Edward Teller and by the idea to put his knowledge on nuclear explosions to use in a field that wouldn't be hindered by nuclear test bans. The model was written in assembly language, which may have given it a headstart compared to other climate model projects that were undergoing in Livermore at the time and which relied on compiler language. There appear to have been four versions, based on reports of improvement work on the code, and Leith publicized numerous videos (at the time called "movies") of the output of his model. Today, the readable presentation of the often enormous quantities of data output by climate models is a major problem in climate modelling; and Leith's example inspired other scientists to make videos as well. Leith apparently relied on a private company, Pacific Title, which worked in the entertainment industry at Hollywood, and one video displaying the output of hid model.

== The model ==
This model, which was apparently created single-handedly by Leith, included initially five, later six, elevation levels in the atmosphere and a realistic land-sea distribution, with the entire model covering the latitudes between the equator and 60° north on a 5° grid. Later its scope was broadened to the polar regions. It included parametrized drag, eddy diffusion, radiative processes but no topography. It could simulate the day-night temperature cycle but did not yield realistic precipitation distribution even after improvement work. Later versions were used to simulate the climate of Mars and the behaviour of the Arctic during the ice ages.

== Significance ==
Leith twice claimed that his model was the first to include a simulated hydrological cycle. There are other earlier models discussed in the literature, but only little evidence that they were actually operative; it is not clear when hydrological cycles began to be included in climate models but it appears that it was after the Leith model. The model was however only once used in an academic publication, specifically in a 1968 publication about atmospheric tides, as Leith's interest shifted to two dimensional turbulence, and ultimately his model proved much less influential than other climate modelling efforts.
