= Cloud fraction =

Cloud fraction is the percentage of each pixel in satellite imagery or each grid box in a weather or climate model that is covered with clouds. A cloud fraction of one means the pixel is completely covered with clouds, while a cloud fraction of zero represents a totally cloud free pixel. Cloud fraction is important for the modeling of downward radiation. Unlike sky cover, cloud fraction is often treated as the proportion of a horizontal area covered by clouds as viewed from below.
