= Edward Epstein (meteorologist) =

American meteorologist

- Born: April 29, 1931; The Bronx (United States)
- Died: October 14, 2008 (aged 77); Potomac (United States)
- Education: Harvard University, Columbia Business School, Pennsylvania State University
- Employer: National Oceanic and Atmospheric Administration (1973–1993); University of Michigan (1960–1973)

Edward Epstein (April 29, 1931, in The Bronx, New York City – October 14, 2008, in Potomac, Maryland) was an American meteorologist who pioneered the use of statistical methods in weather forecasting and the development of ensemble forecasting techniques.

== Education and early career ==
According to his obituary in the Bulletin of the American Meteorological Society (BAMS), Epstein's years in middle school and high school were marked by "illustrious academic achievements." Graduating from the Bronx High School of Science in 1947, he applied at the age of 15 to Harvard, the University of Chicago, and the University of California, and was accepted to all three. He entered Harvard on a full scholarship at age 16.

He graduated from Harvard in 1951 with a Bachelor of Science in Astronomy. He studied statistics at the Graduate School of Business Administration at Columbia University, and received an M.B.A. in 1953. During this period he participated in Columbia's Conservation of Human Resources Project.

== Career ==
BAMS describes Epstein as having been "assisted in his career choice by the U.S. government, which offered him the options of being drafted, entering Officer's Candidate School and becoming a naval supply officer, or attending Penn State as an air force officer and studying meteorology." Until then, he had never heard of meteorology, but chose the latter because of his keen interest in science. He was in the Air Force from 1953 to 1957, and received a Master of Science degree from Pennsylvania State University in 1954.

After attending the Officer's Basic Military Course at Lackland Air Force Base in Texas in 1954, he was assigned to do research under the auspices of the Air Force Cambridge Research Center. He then went to Flagstaff, Arizona, to determine the vertical distribution of atmospheric ozone. According to BAMS, the paper that resulted, "A New Method for Determining the Vertical Distribution of Ozone from a Ground Station," "established his reputation as a research scientist" and "led to his being invited by Penn State to pursue a doctorate in meteorology." He received a Ph.D. in meteorology from that institution in 1960.

In the late 1950s Epstein worked at Arizona State University and then at Penn State. During this time he published two papers in 1959 about the power spectrum analysis of ozone and about vertical velocities in the lower stratosphere.

=== University of Michigan ===
From 1960 to 1973, Epstein was at the University of Michigan, first as a lecturer and research associate in meteorology; then as an assistant professor (1961–63), associate professor (1963–68), and full professor (1968–73). During his years at Michigan, the meteorology program, which was originally part of the Civil Engineering Department of the College of Engineering, grew by stages into the Department of Atmospheric, Oceanic, and Space Sciences. Epstein played a critical role in this development, and was named chairman of the department in 1971. As head of the department, Epstein broadened its scope to include studies of aeronomy and planetary atmospheres. He was also a member of the College Standing Committee and the University Research Policies Committee.

From 1962 to 1964, Epstein was also a scientific consultant to the Assistant Secretary of Commerce for Science and Technology, focusing on international meteorological programs.

During his years at Michigan, Epstein published many papers on probability forecasting, quality control, and forecast utility, some of them written with Allan Murphy. In 1962 Epstein published a paper in the Journal of Applied Meteorology entitled "A Bayesian Approach to Decision Making in Applied Meteorology." This was "the first formal treatment of Bayes's theorem in meteorology," according to BAMS. Another paper that involved Bayes's theorem was "Quality Control for Probability Forecasts," in which, as Epstein explained in the abstract, he used Bayes' theorem to develop "a method of quality control for probability forecasts."

Epstein's and Murphy's paper "A Note on Probability Forecasts and 'Hedging,'" published in the Journal of Applied Meteorology in 1967, "introduced the term 'proper' in connection with forecasts and scoring systems," according to BAMS, which noted that new scoring systems "are almost always subjected to this 'properness' test."

=== Stockholm University ===
Epstein spent the 1968–69 academic year at the Stockholm University as a visiting scientist. While there, he wrote a pathbreaking paper, "Stochastic Dynamic Prediction," which appeared in the journal Tellus in 1969. The paper demonstrated, as he wrote in the abstract, "how the stochastic method can be used to assess the value of new or improved data by considering their influence on the decrease in the uncertainty of the forecast." BAMS said that this paper was perhaps Epstein's "most profound scientific achievement," adding that Epstein's "concept was so visionary that human and computer resources have not yet been able to capitalize fully on it."

He continued to work on this topic after returning to Michigan, where he published several related papers in collaboration with two of his students, Rex Fleming and Eric Pitcher. During his time in Stockholm, he also developed a ranked probability score that came to be widely used in forecast verification.

Another important 1969 paper was "The Role of Initial Uncertainties in Predictions," published in the Journal of Applied Meteorology. In this paper, according to BAMS, Epstein "studied the ensemble of forecasts made from a set of predictive equations with slightly differing initial conditions. While not the first to study this problem and use the term 'ensemble' in regard to weather prediction," Epstein "was instrumental in setting the course for the many ensemble systems operational today." "A Scoring System for Probability Forecasts," published in the same journal in the same year, is described by BAMS as "one of the cornerstones in evaluating probability forecasts of ordered variables."

=== NOAA ===
In 1973 Epstein was appointed Associate Administrator for Environmental Monitoring and Prediction at the National Oceanic and Atmospheric Administration, an agency of the Department of Commerce, in Washington, D.C. In announcing Epstein's appointment, Secretary of Commerce Frederick B. Dent said, "Dr. Epstein's record of achievement in several major areas of science and administration is an impressive one, and I am pleased indeed at his acceptance of this position, one of considerable importance to the Department's environmental programs." Epstein later served as the NOAA's Acting Assistant Administrator for Research and Development.

During his years at the NOAA, according to BAMS, Epstein "was extremely supportive of the planning and execution of the GARP Atlantic Tropical Experiment (GATE) and the Global Weather Experiment, including the development of numerical models and global observing systems."

On November 3, 1978, in the wake of the passage of the National Climate Program Act of 1978, NOAA administrator Richard A. Frank announced the establishment of a National Climate Program, its purpose being "to assist the nation and the world to understand and respond to natural and man-induced climate processes and their implications." Epstein, who had "helped nurture the preparation" of the 1978 law, was named director of the National Climate Program Office. In that position, "he ensured that the fledgling Climate Analysis Center (CAC) in the National Weather Service would be given both research and operations missions, thus greatly enhancing its viability."

On May 5, 1981, it was announced that Epstein had been appointed director of the NOAA's Climate and Earth Sciences Laboratory.

=== Climate Analysis Center ===
In 1983 Epstein joined the National Weather Service's National Meteorological Center as chief scientist of the Climate Analysis Center, and it was there that he published his influential meteorological monograph "Statistical Inference and Prediction in Climatology: A Bayesian Approach." Another important work published during this period was a 162-page NOAA Technical Report entitled "A Precipitation Climatology of 5-Day Periods" (1988).

Epstein's paper "A Spectral Climatology" appeared in the first issue of The Journal of Climate, which began to be published by the American Meteorological Society (AMS) in 1988. In October 1988, The Journal of Climate published a paper written by Epstein and A.G. Barnston, "A Precipitation Climatology of Five-Day Periods," in which the authors, according to the abstract, develop a "precipitation climatology...for the relative frequencies of zero, one, or two or mere days with measurable precipitation within 5-day periods. The purpose of the climatology is to provide background for the development and introduction of extended-range (6- to 10-day forecast period) precipitation forecasts in terms of the probabilities of the three categories."

Epstein went on to publish several other papers in The Journal of Climate, including one about the optimum number of harmonics to represent normals and another about obtaining climatological values from monthly means. In 1988, Epstein also wrote a paper on long-range weather prediction for Weather and Forecasting. In 1989, Epstein and Murphy published an important paper in Monthly Weather Review entitled "Skill Scores and Correlation Coefficients in Model Verification."

An article in the Christian Science Monitor on January 25, 1985, reported on the possibility that climate was changing, and cited Epstein along with two NOAA colleagues, Thomas R. Karl and Robert E. Livezey, as having determined "that the past decade has had an abnormally high frequency of extreme winters -- six years out of eight between 1975 and 1983."

Epstein went on to publish a number of informal research papers which "appeared as NMC office notes, in proceedings of climate diagnostic workshops, and in preprints of AMS conferences." The papers "focused on removing systematic errors in numerical models, making objective 6- to 10-day forecasts of temperature and precipitation in probability form, and developing new statistical techniques such as the imperfect prog method and the Kalman filter (which he discussed yesterday at 5IMSC)."

== Retirement ==
After retiring from the NOAA in 1993, he joined Murphy in forming a company, Prediction and Evaluation Systems.

In his later years, Epstein suffered from Parkinson's disease. Although it eventually became debilitating, he remained active despite the disease for several years. He died on October 14, 2008, Potomac, Maryland.

== Affiliations ==
Epstein was a Certified Consulting Meteorologist, a Fellow of the American Meteorological Society, Editor of the Journal of Applied Meteorology (1971–73), Associate Editor of the Journal of Geophysical Research, Associate Editor of The Journal of Climate (1988–94), a trustee of the University Corporation for Atmospheric Research, and Chairman of its Budget and Program Committee. He served on committees of the National Science Foundation and the National Academy of Sciences/National Academy of Engineering. He was also a member of the American Geophysical Union, the American Statistical Association, and the Royal Meteorological Society. He was elected a Fellow of the American Association for the Advancement of Science in 1978. He was chair of the Meteorological Statistics Committee of the AMS from 1967 to 1969, and was an AMS councilor from 1974 to 1977.

== Honors and awards ==
Epstein won an award for outstanding achievement at the 1992 International Meeting on Statistical Climatology

== Personal life and attributes ==
On presenting Epstein with the 1992 award, colleague William H. Klein called him "one of the world's leading experts on statistical meteorology and climatology...an original thinker and a man of few words." He added that Epstein was "also a great human being – helpful, generous, honest, and unselfish."

BAMS's obituary of Epstein noted that at CAC, he "treated his assistants as equals, wrote FORTRAN codes of startling economy and sophistication, applied them to projects of great practical value to CAC, and offered statistical advice and dryly humorous comments to all who asked. His combination of keenness and kindness are remembered affectionately by those who encountered him at CAC."

Epstein and his wife, Alice, had four children, Debra, Harry, Nancy, and Bill, and eight grandchildren.

== Epstein Symposium ==
The American Meteorological Society held an Edward S. Epstein Symposium at its 2014 annual meeting. It was devoted to the "Contributions of Dr. Edward S. Epstein to Scientific Endeavor." The theme of the annual meeting was "Extreme Weather—Climate and the Build Environment: New Perspectives Opportunities, and Tools," a topic that the AMS describes as being "most relevant to the NOAA goal and the National Weather Service vision for 'A Weather-Ready Nation – a society that is prepared for and responds to weather related events,' and to Dr. Epstein's work as he was continually searching for better scientific understanding and better ways to harness science to improve our service to the nation."
