= Unified Model =

Weather prediction software

The Unified Model is a numerical weather prediction and climate modeling software suite originally developed by the United Kingdom Met Office from 1990 and now both used and further developed by many weather-forecasting agencies around the world. The Unified Model gets its name because a single model is used across a range of both timescales (nowcasting to centennial) and spatial scales (convective scale to climate system earth modelling). The Met Office was the first national meteorological organisation to design and implement such a model into operations at the time. The model is grid-point based, rather than wave based, and is run on a variety of supercomputers around the world. The Unified Model atmosphere can also be coupled to a number of ocean models. At the Met Office, it is used for the main suite of weather prediction models, for deployable and on-demand weather models, and for seasonal and climate modelling. Similar Unified Model suites with global and regional domains are used by many other national or military weather agencies around the world for operational forecasting.

Data for numerical weather prediction is provided by observations from satellites, from the ground (both human and from automatic weather stations), from buoys at sea, radar, radiosonde weather balloons, wind profilers, commercial aircraft and a background field from previous model runs. The computer model is only adjusted towards the observations using assimilation, rather than forcing the model to accept an observed value that might make the system unstable (and could be an inaccurate observation). The Unified Model software suite is written in Fortran (originally 77 but predominantly 90 as of 2003). Because most developments of interest are near to the ground the vertical layers are closer together near the surface. A major update was deployed in August 2002, called "New Dynamics".

== Principal UM suites at the Met Office ==
The Met Office runs a range of Numerical Weather Prediction suites using the UM.

All of the models use varying resolutions of topography with greater accuracy at higher resolutions. The limiting factor with all models is that for a weather event to be recorded by the model it must be at least three grid points in size. Thus, for a model at 40 km, a weather system must be at least 120 km to be modelled. This means smaller phenomena such as small depressions, smaller hurricanes and large thunderstorms are too small for the model to handle. As the resolution increases, smaller events can be caught; the 1.5 km model for example, is reputedly capable of modelling individual showers.

=== Global Ensemble Model (MOGREPS-G) ===
MOGREPS-G is an ensemble model that runs multiple simulations to reduce the overall average error caused by the inherent uncertainty in the observation and modelling process. The model consists of 18 ensemble members with a 10 km horizontal resolution and 70 vertical levels, forecasting out to 168 hours (7 days) with a model run every 6 hours. The latest two runs can be combined to give a 36-member ensemble.

=== UK Ensemble Model (MOGREPS-UK) ===
The UK ensemble model consists of 3 ensemble members with a 1.5–4 km horizontal resolution and 70 vertical levels, forecasting out to 120 hours (5 days) with a model run every hour. The latest 6 runs can be combined to give a 18-member ensemble.

=== Global Deterministic Model ===
Approximately 10 km resolution with 70 vertical levels across the entire global domain. Forecasts alternate between 60 hour (2.5 day) and 144 hour (6 day) extents. The Global model provides boundary information for the smaller-domain models. The model is kept close to the real atmosphere using hybrid 4D-Var data assimilation of observations.

=== UK Deterministic Model (UKV) ===
1.5–4 km horizontal resolution and 70 vertical levels. The resolution is 1.5 km over the UK and 4 km over surrounding areas. Forecast lengths vary, with hourly forecasts out to 12 hours, three-hourly forecasts out to 54 hours (2.25 days), and twice-daily forecasts out to 120 hours (5 days.) The model uses boundary conditions from the global deterministic model, sea conditions from the AMM15 shelf seas model, and is kept close to observations using 4D-Var data assimilation hourly.

=== North Atlantic and European model (retired) ===
The Met Office's North Atlantic and European model (NAE) model had 70 levels with a 12 km resolution. It was run out to 48 hours from start. Because the UK is at a northern latitude the model transposes the model area to an equatorial location so that the grid points give an area that is more square. This reduces the load on the model, allowing it to run more quickly. The model was kept close to the real atmosphere using 4D-Var data assimilation of observations.

=== Euro 4km model (retired) ===
70 Vertical levels, 4.4 km horizontal resolution. Ran out to 120 hours. Now superseded by the UKV in many applications and by the Global Model in others.

=== DRMs/CAMs ===
Defence Regional Models and Crisis Area Models are models using the same science configuration as the UK model which can be deployed rapidly to support military operations and disaster relief efforts. For example, to support the MMU or environmental catastrophes.

=== Mountain Wave Models ===
This high resolution model provides information on mountain waves for a variety of locations around the UK and other areas of interest to the Met Office.

=== Met Office's Global Wave Model ===
This models sea waves around the world.

== UM suites outside the Met Office ==
Unified Model suites which are similar to those from the Met Office are run by the Australian Bureau of Meteorology, the Australian Commonwealth Scientific and Industrial Research Organisation, the South African Weather Service, the Norwegian Meteorological Institute, the New Zealand National Institute of Water and Atmospheric Research, the (South) Korea Meteorological Administration and the National Centre for Medium Range Weather Forecasting, a subordinate office of the Indian Ministry of Earth Sciences.

=== Australian Bureau of Meteorology ===
The Australian Bureau of Meteorology, have an operational 12.5 km resolution deterministic (ACCESS-G) and 33 km resolution ensemble (ACCESS-GE) global forecasting system utilizing the Unified Model. This global system provides boundary conditions for a number of higher resolution regional systems also using the Unified Model. These include a 1.5 km resolution deterministic (ACCESS-C) and 2.2 km resolution ensemble (ACCESS-CE) model over Australia and a 4 km resolution relocatable model (ACCESS-TC.)

=== (South) Korea Meteorological Administration ===
The (South) Korea Meteorological Administration have an operational 10 km resolution global forecasting system utilizing the Unified Model. This global system provides boundary conditions for a 1.5 km resolution local Unified Model NWP system covering the Korean Peninsula Region.

== UKCA ==
United Kingdom Chemistry & Aerosols (UKCA) is a sub-model of the UM that deals with trace gas and aerosol chemistry within the model. This includes calculating the concentrations of climatically relevant gases such as methane and ozone, as well as the composition and evolution of aerosols. As with most of the UM, the UKCA was written in a collaboration between the UK Met Office and UK Academia.

== JULES ==
Joint UK Land Environment System is a land surface model that has been developed in a collaboration between the Met Office and other research institutes. JULES models the exchange of heat and moisture between the Unified Model atmosphere and the land surface and vegetation. JULES can also be used offline to estimate the impacts of different climate models on the land surface and hydrology.
