= European Centre for Medium-Range Weather Forecasts =

European intergovernmental weather computation organisation based in the UK

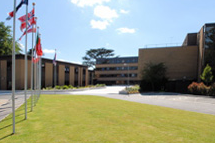
- Established: 1975 (51 years ago)
- Headquarters: Reading, Berkshire
- Country: United Kingdom
- Coordinates: 51°25′11″N 0°57′03″W
- Directors: Florian Pappenberger
- Website: ecmwf.int

The European Centre for Medium-Range Weather Forecasts (ECMWF) is an independent intergovernmental organisation supported by most of the nations of Europe. It is based at three sites: Shinfield Park, Reading, United Kingdom; Bologna, Italy; and Bonn, Germany. It operates one of the largest supercomputer complexes in Europe and the world's largest archive of numerical weather prediction data.

== History ==
members as of 2015 co-operation agreement

ECMWF was established in 1975, in recognition of the need to pool the scientific and technical resources of Europe's meteorological services and institutions for the production of weather forecasts for medium-range timescales (up to approximately two weeks) and of the economic and social benefits expected from it. The Centre employs about 350 staff, mostly appointed from across the member states and co-operating states.

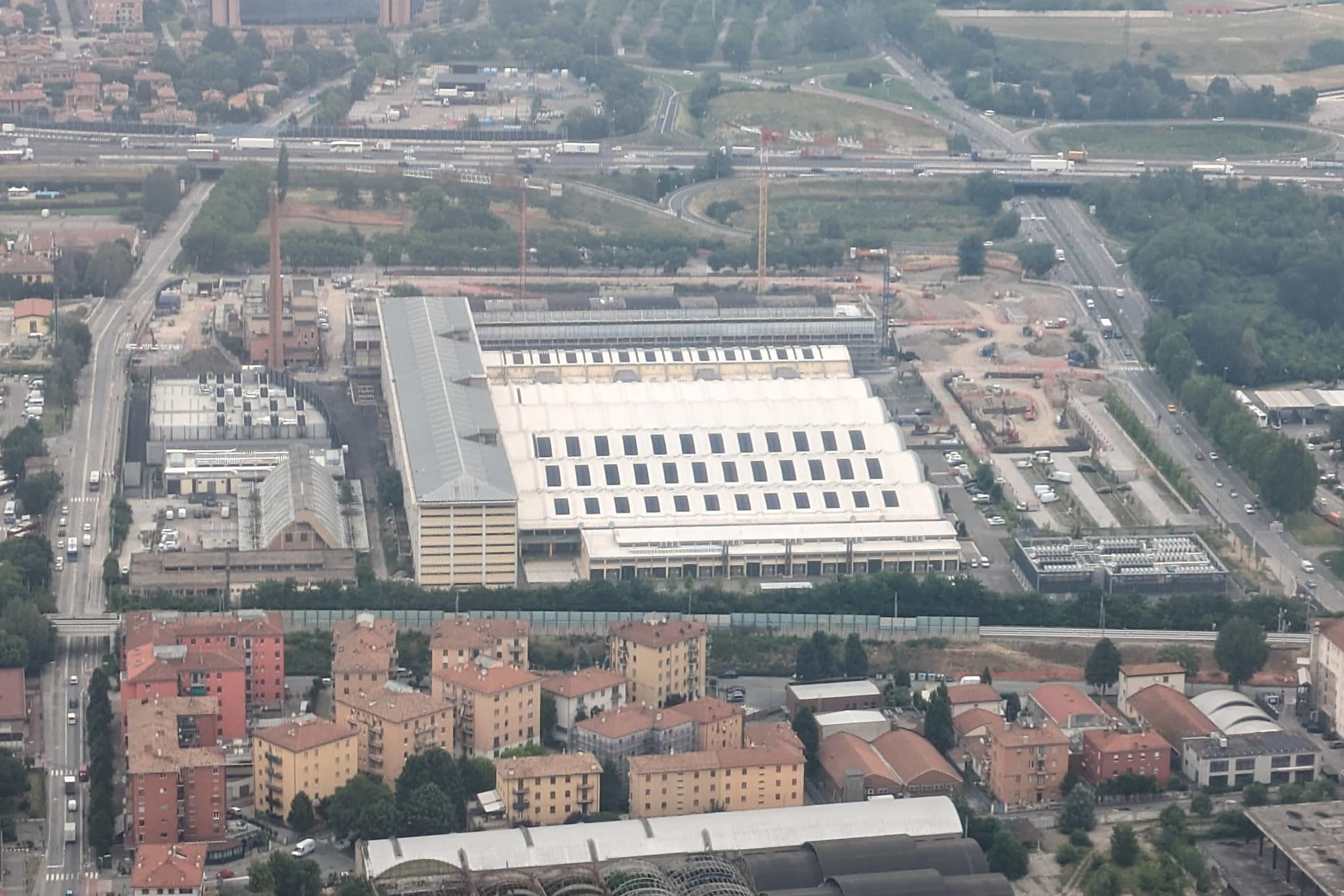
Aerial view of the data centre in Bologna, Italy.

In 2017, the Centre's member states accepted an offer from the Italian Government to move ECMWF's data centre to Bologna, Italy. The new site, a former tobacco factory, would be redesigned by the architecture firm gmp.

During 2020, the Centre arranged to move its Copernicus operations away from Reading and into European Union territory. Following bids from Toulouse, Italy, Austria, Germany, Spain and Ireland, eventually Bonn (Germany) was chosen. The move has been directly attributed to Brexit.

In early 2024, it was announced that the ECMWF's headquarters, currently at Shinfield Road in the English town of Reading, would be relocated to a new complex to be constructed on the Whiteknights Park campus of the University of Reading. Construction of this complex started in early 2025, with completion expected in early 2027.

== Objectives ==
ECMWF aims to provide accurate medium-range global weather forecasts out to 15 days and seasonal forecasts out to 12 months. Its products are provided to the national weather services of its member states and co-operating states as a complement to their national short-range and climatological activities, and those national states use ECMWF's products for their own national duties, in particular to give early warning of potentially damaging severe weather.

ECMWF's core mission is to:

- Produce numerical weather forecasts and monitor planetary systems that influence weather
- Carry out scientific and technical research to improve forecast skill
- Maintain an archive of meteorological data

To deliver this core mission, the Centre provides:

- Twice-daily global numerical weather forecasts
- Air quality analysis
- Atmospheric composition monitoring
- Climate monitoring
- Ocean circulation analysis
- Hydrological prediction

The Centre develops and operates global atmospheric models and data assimilation systems for the dynamics, thermodynamics and composition of the Earth's atmosphere and for interacting parts of the Earth-system. It uses numerical weather prediction methods to prepare forecasts and their initial conditions, and it contributes to monitoring the relevant parts of the Earth system.

=== Copernicus ===
The centre currently serves as the Entrusted Entity responsible for delivery of two of the Services of the EU's Copernicus Programme. The two services are the Copernicus Atmosphere Monitoring Service (CAMS) and the Copernicus Climate Change Service (C3S).

The Centre arranged to move its Copernicus operations away from Reading and into Bonn (Germany) in 2020. The move has been directly attributed to Brexit.

== Work and projects ==
=== Forecasting ===
Numerical weather prediction (NWP) requires input of meteorological data, collected by satellites and earth observation systems such as automatic and crewed weather stations, aircraft (including commercial flights), ships and weather balloons. Assimilation of this data is used to produce an initial state of a computer model of the atmosphere, from which an atmospheric model is used to forecast the weather. These forecasts are typically:

- medium-range forecasts, predicting the weather up to 15 days ahead
- monthly forecasts, predicting the weather on a weekly basis 30 days ahead
- seasonal forecasts up to 12 months ahead.

Over the past three decades ECMWF's wide-ranging programme of research has played a major role in developing such assimilation and modelling systems. This improves the accuracy and reliability of weather forecasting by about a day per decade, so that a seven-day forecast now (2015) is as accurate as a three-day forecast was four decades ago (1975).

=== Monthly and seasonal forecasts ===
ECMWF's monthly and seasonal forecasts provide early predictions of events such as heat waves, cold spells and droughts, as well as their impacts on sectors such as agriculture, energy and health. Since ECMWF runs a wave model, there are also predictions of coastal waves and storm surges in European waters which can be used to provide warnings.

=== Early warning of severe weather events ===
Forecasts of severe weather events allow appropriate mitigating action to be taken and contingency plans to be put into place by the authorities and the public. The increased time gained by issuing accurate warnings can save lives, for instance by evacuating people from a storm surge area. Authorities and businesses can plan to maintain services around threats such as high winds, floods or snow.

In October 2012 the ECMWF model suggested seven days in advance that Hurricane Sandy was likely to make landfall on the East Coast of the United States. It also predicted the intensity and track of the November 2012 nor'easter, which impacted the east coast a week after Sandy.

ECMWF's Extreme Forecast Index (EFI) was developed as a tool to identify where the EPS (Ensemble Prediction System) forecast distribution differs substantially from that of the model climate. It contains information regarding variability of weather parameters, in location and time and can highlight an abnormality of a weather situation without having to define specific space- and time-dependent thresholds.

=== Satellite data ===
ECMWF, through its partnerships with EUMETSAT, ESA, the EU and others, exploits satellite data for operational numerical weather prediction and operational seasonal forecasting with coupled atmosphere–ocean–land models. The increasing amount of satellite data and the development of more sophisticated ways of extracting information from that data have made a major contribution to improving the accuracy and utility of NWP forecasts.

=== Reanalysis ===
ECMWF supports research on climate variability using an approach known as reanalysis. This involves feeding weather observations collected over decades into a NWP system to recreate past atmospheric, sea- and land-surface conditions over specific time periods to obtain a clearer picture of how the climate has changed. Reanalysis provides a four-dimensional picture of the atmosphere and effectively allows monitoring of the variability and change of global climate, thereby contributing also to the understanding and attribution of climate change.

To date, and with support from Europe's National Meteorological Services and the European Commission, ECMWF has conducted several major reanalyses of the global atmosphere: the first ECMWF re-analysis (ERA-15) project generated reanalyses from December 1978 to February 1994; the ERA-40 project generated reanalyses from September 1957 to August 2002. The ERA-Interim reanalysis covered the period from 1979 onwards. A reanalysis product (ERA5) with higher spatial resolution (31 km) was released by ECMWF in 2019 as part of the Copernicus Climate Change Service.

=== Operational forecast model ===
ECMWF's operational forecasts are produced from its "Integrated Forecast System" (sometimes informally known in the United States as the "European model") which is run every twelve hours and forecasts out to ten days.

It includes both a "deterministic forecast" mode and an ensemble. The deterministic forecast is a single model run that is relatively high in resolution as well as in computational expense. The ensemble is relatively low (about half that of the deterministic) in resolution (and in computational expense), so less accurate. But it is run 51 times in parallel, from slightly different initial conditions to give a spread of likelihood over the range of the forecast.

As of 2021, the ECMWF's weather model is generally considered to be the most accurate weather forecasting model.

In 2025, the AIFS became ECMWF's first purely data-driven operational model. In comparison to the Integrated Forecast System, the AIFS does not attempt to explicitly resolve the underlying physics. The AIFS uses a coarser 28 km grid compared to the IFS's 9 km grid.

== Member and co-operating states ==
ECMWF comprises 23 European countries:

- the eighteen founding states of 1975: Austria, Belgium, Denmark, Finland, France, Germany, Greece, Republic of Ireland, Italy, Luxembourg, Netherlands, Norway, Portugal, Spain, Sweden, Switzerland, Turkey, United Kingdom.
- five states that joined since 2010: Iceland (April 2011), Slovenia (December 2012), Serbia (January 2015), Croatia (January 2016), Estonia (December 2020).

It also has co-operation agreements with other states: Bulgaria, Czech Republic, Georgia, Hungary, Israel, Latvia, Lithuania, North Macedonia, Montenegro, Morocco, Romania and Slovakia.

Member state	Year of joining
Austria	1975
Belgium	1975
Croatia	2011
Denmark	1975
Estonia	2020
Finland	1975
France	1975
Germany	1975
Greece	1976
Iceland	2011
Ireland	1975
Italy	1977
Luxembourg	2002
Netherlands	1975
Norway	1989
Portugal	1976
Serbia	2014
Slovenia	2011
Spain	1975
Sweden	1975
Switzerland	1975
Turkey	1976
United Kingdom	1975

Co-operating State	Year of joining
Bulgaria	12 July 2010
Czech Republic	1 August 2001
Georgia	1 December 2021
Hungary	1 July 1994
Israel	28 October 2010
Latvia	30 April 2008
Lithuania	20 November 2006
Montenegro	5 November 2007
Morocco	1 December 2006
North Macedonia	9 February 2011
Romania	22 December 2003
Slovakia	1 January 2008

Co-operating agreements	Year of joining
WMO	1 November 1975
EUMETSAT	18 May 1988
ACMAD	11 May 1995
ALADIN/HIRLAM - Use of IFS/Arpege	19 February 1999
JRC	6 May 2003
CTBTO	24 June 2003
CLRTAP	26 July 2005
ESA	31 May 2005
Memorandum of Understanding for Joint Liaison Office with European institutions in Brussels	23 April 2010
RIMES	8 February 2012
CMA	21 January 2014
US NWS	23 January 2015 (amended 30 January 2018)
US NCAR	31 August 2016
INPE Brazil	31 August 2017

== See also ==
- EUMETNET
- EUMETSAT
- Copernicus Programme
