= Rapid Update Cycle =

Weather forecasting system used in the U.S. until 2012

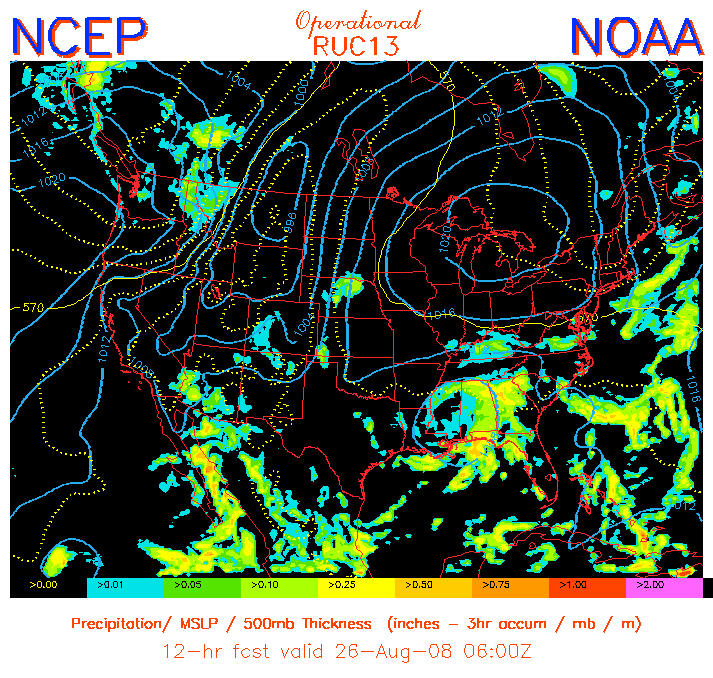
Graphical 12-hour forecast output from RUC2

The Rapid Update Cycle (RUC) was an American atmospheric prediction system that consisted primarily of a numerical forecast model and an analysis system to initialize the model. The first operational implementation was created in 1994, with 60km resolution and a 3-hour cycle.

The RUC was designed to provide accurate short-range (0- to 12-hr, later expanded to 18-hr in 2010) numerical forecast guidance for weather-sensitive users, such as those in the aviation community. Significant weather forecasting problems that occur in the 0- to 12-hr range include severe weather in all seasons (for example, tornadoes, thunderstorms, snow, and ice storms) and hazards to aviation (for example, clear air turbulence, icing, and downbursts).

The RUC ran at the highest frequency of any forecast model at the National Centers for Environmental Prediction (NCEP), assimilating recent observations to provide very high frequency updates of current conditions and short-range forecasts. This update frequency was only once an hour (the standard interval for ASOS observation reporting), and with computational limitations and the time required to assimilate all of the data, there is approximately a one-hour delay in producing the forecasts. Because of this, it was common practice to use a one-hour forecast from the RUC as a current analysis, as the one-hour forecast would come out only a few minutes before the time it is forecasting for. There is also little possibility for error in a one-hour forecast, meaning that the RUC's one-hour forecast would not usually vary greatly from the actual state of the atmosphere at that particular point in time.

The RUC was decommissioned on May 1, 2012; it was replaced by the Rapid Refresh (RR or RAP) model, based on the WRF. Like the RUC, the Rapid Refresh model also runs hourly out to 18 hours on a 13 km (8.1 mi) grid spacing, but also covers a wider area. An experimental High Resolution Rapid Refresh (HRRR) ran by the Earth System Research Laboratories (ESRL) offers 3 km (1.9 mi) resolution at 15-minute intervals. A backup version of the RUC continued to run until that too was stopped on May 15, 2013, thus formally bringing an end to the model.
