= Shuman (surname) =

- Amy Shuman (1925-2014), American baseball player
- Andrew Shuman (1830-1890), American newspaper editor and politician
- Buddy Shuman (1915–1955), professional auto racer
- Frank Shuman (1862–1918), American inventor, engineer and solar energy pioneer
- Freddie Shuman, Hungarian composer and musician
- Frederick Gale Shuman (1919–2005), numerical weather prediction pioneer
- Harry Shuman (1915–1996), Major League Baseball player
- Jeffrey Shuman (born 1962), American-French bank robber
- John Shuman, officer in the United States Army during World War I
- Kerri Shuman, American bridge player
- Lenox Shuman (born 1973), Guyanese politician
- Mort Shuman (1936–1991), American singer, pianist, and songwriter
- Michael Shuman, American rock musician, bass guitarist for Queens of the Stone Age
- Peter Shuman (19 January 1933 – 29 January 1993), South African cricketer
- René Shuman, Dutch singer
- Ron Shuman, American sprint car race driver
- Tom Shuman, Canadian football player
- William Shuman (1921 – 1978), American politician
- William Irving Shuman (1882–1958), American businessman, banker and political activist
