= Platzman =

Platzman is a surname. Notable people with the surname include:

- Daniel Platzman (born 1986), American musician, songwriter, record producer, and composer
- George W. Platzman (1920–2008), American meteorologist
