= Mesoscale discussion =

A mesoscale discussion may refer to:

- Mesoscale convective discussion, a forecast concerning thunderstorms issued by the Storm Prediction Center (SPC)
- Mesoscale precipitation discussion, a forecast concerning precipitation issued by the Weather Prediction Center (WPC)
