= NGM =

NGM can refer to:

- NASDAQ Global Market
- National Guitar Museum, USA
- Nested Grid Model, for weather prediction
- Nevada Gold Mines, a mining company
- New Generation Mobile, a phone manufacturer
- Nordic Growth Market, a Swedish exchange for Nordic growth companies
