= NOAA National Operational Model Archive and Distribution System =

Climate and weather data provider

The NOAA National Operational Model Archive and Distribution System (NOMADS) is a web-services based project providing both real-time and retrospective format independent access to climate and weather model data.

== Overview ==
To address a growing need for remote access to high volume numerical weather prediction and global climate models and data, the National Climatic Data Center (NCDC), along with the National Centers for Environmental Prediction (NCEP) and the Geophysical Fluid Dynamics Laboratory (GFDL), initiated the NOAA Operational Model Archive and Distribution System (NOMADS) project. NOMADS addresses model data access needs as outlined in the U.S. Weather Research Program (USWRP) "Implementation Plan for Research in Quantitative Precipitation Forecasting" and Data Assimilation to "redeem practical value of research findings and facilitate their transfer into operations." The NOMADS framework was also developed to facilitate climate model and observational data inter-comparison issues as discussed in documents such as the Intergovernmental Panel on Climate Change (IPCC 1990, 1995, 2001) and the U.S. National Assessment (2000). NOMADS is being developed as "A Unified Climate and Weather Archive" so that users can make decisions about their specific needs on time scales from days (weather), to months (El Nino), to decades (global warming).

== Project ==
NOMADS is a network of data servers using established and emerging technologies to access and integrate model and other data stored in geographically distributed repositories in heterogeneous formats. NOMADS enables the sharing and inter-comparing of model results and is a major collaborative effort, spanning multiple Government agencies and academic institutions. The data available under the NOMADS framework include model input and Numerical Weather Prediction (NWP) gridded output from NCEP, and Global Climate Models (GCM) and simulations from GFDL and other leading institutions from around the world. The goals of NOMADS are to:

- improve access to NWP and GCM's model output and provide the observational and model data assimilation products for Regional model initialization and forecast verification,
- promote improvements to operational weather forecasts,
- develop linkages between the research and operational modeling communities and foster collaborations between the climate and weather modeling communities,
- promote product development and collaborations within the geo-science communities (ocean, weather, and climate) to study multiple earth systems using collections of distributed data under a sustainable system architecture.

== Partnerships ==
The NOMADS framework is actively partnering with existing and development activities including the Comprehensive Large Array Stewardship System (CLASS); the National Oceanographic Partnership Program's (NOPP) National Virtual Ocean Data System (NVODS); the Department of Energy's Earth System Grid (ESG); and the Thematic Real-time Environmental Data Distributed Services (THREDDS) project being developed through the National Science Foundation and Unidata. To ensure that Agency and Institutional requirements are being met, the NOMADS collaborator's have established Science and Technical Advisory Panels. These newly established panels would ensure the NOMADS system and metadata architecture could provide necessary inter-operability; and develop data archive requirement recommendations to NOAA.

== Benefits ==
NOMADS fosters system inter-operability by integrating legacy systems and emerging technologies and existing metadata conventions used for models and observational data. NOMADS relies on local decisions about data holdings. Loosely combining legacy systems, while developing new ways to support data access to valuable data, permits NOMADS to work on the cutting edge of distributed data systems. In this effort, no one institution carries the weight of data delivery since data are distributed across the network, and served by the institutions that developed the data. The responsibility for documentation falls on the data generator; with the Advisory Panels ensuring overall quality and systems standards, and to determine which NOMADS data are required for long-term storage. Further, NOMADS in no way precludes the need for national centers to maintain and support long-term archives. In fact, NOMADS and secure data archives are mutually supportive and necessary for long-term research. The primary science benefit of the NOMADS framework is that it enables a feedback mechanism to tie Government and university research directly back to the NOAA operational communities, numerical weather prediction quality control and diagnostics processes at NCEP, and climate model assessments and inter-comparisons from around the world.
