= Norman A. Phillips =

American meteorologist (1923–2019)

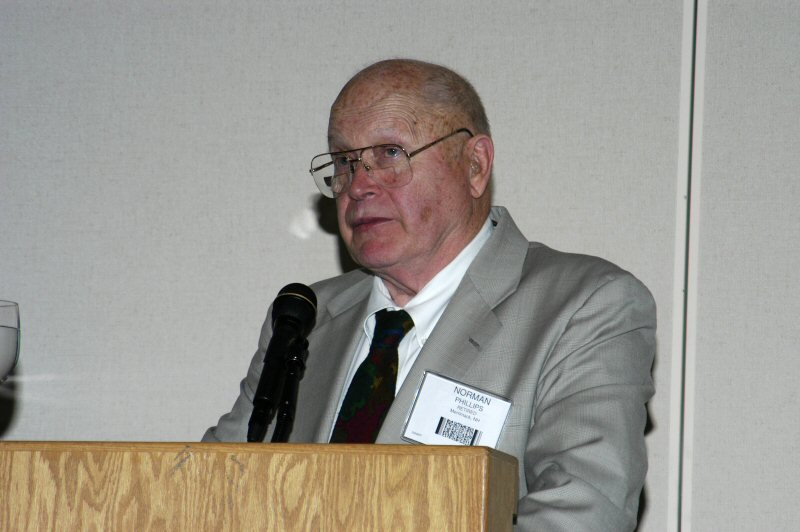
Norman Phillips in 2004

Norman A. Phillips (July 9, 1923 – March 15, 2019) was an American meteorologist notable for his contributions to geophysical fluid dynamics. In 1956, he developed a mathematical model that could realistically depict monthly and seasonal patterns in the troposphere, which became the first successful general circulation model of climate.

== About ==
Phillips was born in Chicago, Illinois. His parents, Alton Elmer Anton Phillips and Linnea (Larson) Phillips, were the children of Swedish immigrants to the United States. He enrolled at the University of Chicago in 1940, intending to study chemistry, but the start of World War II and the influence of Carl-Gustaf Rossby inspired him to join the Army Air Corps in 1943.

After graduating from the meteorological cadet program at Chanute Field as fourth in a class of 391, he served in the Azores and then at Westover Field until October 1946. He returned to the University of Chicago after the war, earning his bachelor's degree in 1947, his master's in 1948, and his PhD in 1951.

Shortly before completing his PhD, Phillips accepted a position on the research staff of the Electronic Computer Project at the Institute for Advanced Study in Princeton, New Jersey. In 1956, he was recruited by the Department of Meteorology at the Massachusetts Institute of Technology, eventually becoming department head.

In 1974, Phillips left MIT to join the National Weather Service at the National Meteorological Center, where he served as the principal scientist of the NMC Development Division. When he retired, the Nested Grid Model was popularly known as "Norm's Great Model."

Phillips died at Grace House in Windham, New Hampshire on March 15, 2019. He published his last academic paper, on the Foucault pendulum, at the age of 90.

== Awards ==
In 1956, his seminal paper, "The general circulation of the atmosphere: a numerical experiment," was recognized with the first Napier Shaw Memorial Prize from the Royal Meteorological Society.

Phillips was elected to the National Academy of Sciences in 1976.

He and his colleague Joseph Smagorinsky were awarded a Benjamin Franklin Medal (Franklin Institute) in 2003.

Phillips was also an honorary member of the American Meteorological Society, and a recipient of their highest honor, the Carl-Gustaf Rossby Research Medal.

== Works ==
- Phillips, Norman A. (April 1956). "The general circulation of the atmosphere: a numerical experiment." Quarterly Journal of the Royal Meteorological Society 82 (352): 123–154. Bibcode:1956QJRMS..82..123P. doi:10.1002/qj.49708235202.
