= Model output statistics =

Weather-forecasting technique

In weather forecasting, model output statistics (MOS) is a multiple linear regression technique in which predictands, often near-surface quantities (such as two-meter-above-ground-level air temperature, horizontal visibility, and wind direction, speed and gusts), are related statistically to one or more predictors. The predictors are typically forecasts from a numerical weather prediction (NWP) model, climatic data, and, if applicable, recent surface observations. Thus, output from NWP models can be transformed by the MOS technique into sensible weather parameters that are familiar to a layperson.

== Background ==
Output directly from the NWP model's lowest layer(s) generally is not used by forecasters because the actual physical processes that occur within the Earth's boundary layer are crudely approximated in the model (i.e., physical parameterizations) along with its relatively coarse horizontal resolution. Because of this lack of fidelity and its imperfect initial state, forecasts of near-surface quantities obtained directly from the model are subject to systematic (bias) and random model errors, which tend to grow with time.

In the development of MOS equations, past observations and archived NWP model forecast fields are used with a screening regression to determine the 'best' predictors and their coefficients for a particular predictand and forecast time. By using archived model forecast output along with verifying surface observations, the resulting equations implicitly take into account physical effects and processes which the underlying numerical weather prediction model cannot explicitly resolve, resulting in much better forecasts of sensible weather quantities. In addition to correcting systematic errors, MOS can produce reliable probabilities of weather events from a single model run. In contrast, despite the enormous amount of computing resources devoted to generating them, ensemble model forecasts' relative frequency of events—often used as a proxy for probability—do not exhibit useful reliability. Thus, ensemble NWP model output also requires additional post-processing in order to obtain reliable probabilistic forecasts, using nonhomogeneous Gaussian regression or other methods.

== History ==
=== United States ===
MOS was conceived and planning for its use began within the U.S. National Weather Service’s (NWS’s) Techniques Development Laboratory (TDL) in 1965 and forecasts first issued from it in 1968. Since then, TDL, now the Meteorological Development Laboratory (MDL), continued to create, refine and update MOS equation sets as additional NWP models were developed and made operational at the National Meteorological Center (NMC) and then the Environmental Modeling Center or EMC.

Given its multi-decadal history within the U.S. NWS and its continuous improvement and superior skill over direct NWP model output, MOS guidance is still used by forecasters within the agency.

== United States forecast guidance ==
There are eight sets of MOS guidance available from MDL, operational and experimental, covering the span of time from the next hour out to ten days for the United States and most of its territories. (Note: Guam and surrounding Northern Mariana Islands only have GFS MOS guidance available)

Name	Update frequency
Localized Aviation MOS Program (LAMP)	Every hour
North American Mesoscale (NAM) MOS	Twice per day
Short-range Global Forecast System (GFS) MOS	Every six hours
Extended-range GFS MOS	Twice per day
North American Ensemble Forecast System MOS	Twice per day
Short-range ECMWF MOS (Note: Access to ECMWF MOS is restricted to the NOAA organization due to European Centre for Medium-Range Weather Forecasts copyright policy.)	Twice per day
Extended-range ECMWF MOS	Twice per day
Ensemble ECMWF MOS	Twice per day

Nested Grid Model MOS was discontinued in 2009.

Initially, MOS guidance was developed for airports and other fixed locales where METARs (or similar reports) were routinely issued. Therefore, MOS guidance was and continues to be provided in an alphanumeric 'bulletin' format for these locations. Here is an example of a short-range MOS forecast for Clinton-Sherman Airport, Oklahoma (KCSM) based on the EMC's Global Forecast System model output.

KCSM GFS MOS GUIDANCE 8/06/2014 1200 UTC

DT /AUG   6/AUG   7                /AUG   8                /AUG   9 
HR   18 21 00 03 06 09 12 15 18 21 00 03 06 09 12 15 18 21 00 06 12 
N/X                    71         101          74         104    72 
TMP  90 96 94 84 78 74 72 84 95100 98 87 82 78 75 88 98102 99 80 73 
DPT  65 62 62 63 63 63 64 65 63 60 60 62 63 63 64 65 63 60 61 63 63 
CLD  CL FW CL CL BK BK CL CL CL CL CL CL FW CL CL CL CL CL CL OV FW 
WDR  21 20 19 16 16 18 19 22 32 07 11 12 16 18 19 22 22 20 20 19 21 
WSP  14 15 13 11 13 10 10 08 06 06 10 08 10 10 10 14 12 15 15 08 07 
P06         2     9     6     1     2     4     2     4     2  6  5 
P12                    14           5           4          10    12 
Q06         0     0     0     0     0     0     0     0     0  0  0 
Q12                     0           0           0           0     0 
T06     29/27 38/21 22/ 6  8/ 2 26/14 24/ 8 16/ 5 12/ 4 27/18 20/ 7 
T12           58/31       24/ 6       39/16       29/ 6    44/25    
CIG   8  8  8  8  8  8  8  8  8  8  8  8  8  8  8  8  8  8  8  8  8 
VIS   7  7  7  7  7  7  7  7  7  7  7  7  7  7  7  7  7  7  7  7  7 
OBV   N  N  N  N  N  N  N  N  N  N  N  N  N  N  N  N  N  N  N  N  N 

With the availability of private- and government-owned weather mesonets, new objective analysis and interpolation techniques, gridded GFS MOS guidance became available in 2006.

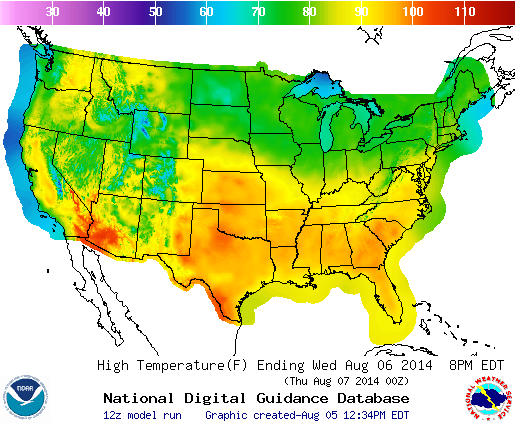

=== Advantages and disadvantages ===
The advantage of MOS forecast guidance as developed in the United States allowed for

- the removal of NWP model bias,
- prediction of weather elements not forecast by the NWP model, e.g., surface visibilities, cloud ceiling heights,
- reliable probabilities of binary events, e.g. probability of precipitation and (severe) thunderstorms,
- reliable probabilities of categorical events, e.g., probability of clear, scattered, broken or overcast skies.

These points, while greatly desired by forecasters, do come at a price. From its very beginnings, the development of robust MOS equations for a particular NWP model required at least two years' worth of archived model output and observations, during which time the NWP model should remain unchanged, or nearly so. This requirement is necessary in order to fully capture the model's error characteristics under a wide variety of meteorological flow regimes for any particular location or region. Extreme meteorological events such as unusual cold- or heat-waves, heavy rain and snowfall, high winds, etc., are important in the development of robust MOS equations. A lengthy model archive has the best chance of capturing such events.

From the 1970s and into the 1980s, this requirement was not very onerous since EMC (then NMC) scientists, being relatively constrained by computational resources at the time, could only make relatively minor, incremental improvements to their NWP models. However, since the 1990s, NWP models have been upgraded more frequently, oftentimes with significant changes in physics and horizontal and vertical grid resolutions. Since MOS corrects systematic biases of the NWP model it is based on, any changes to the NWP model's error characteristics affects MOS guidance, usually in a negative way. This was a factor in the discontinuation of the MOS for the individual ensemble members of the GFS in April 2019; that product had not been updated since 2009, and NOAA decided to cease offering the product instead of bringing it up to date.

In the case of a major upgrade to a NWP model, the EMC will run the newer version of model in parallel with the operational one for many months to allow for direct comparison of model performance. In addition to parallel real-time runs, EMC also runs the newer model to examine past events and seasons, i.e., retrospective forecasts.

All of these runs from the upgraded model allow the National Weather Service, Weather Prediction Center (WPC), National Hurricane Center (NHC), and Storm Prediction Center (SPC) to evaluate its performance prior to the decision to either accept or reject it for operational use. MDL scientists have taken advantage of these runs to evaluate and reformulate the MOS equations as needed to avoid deterioration in guidance quality.

== Other weather centers ==
Royal Netherlands Meteorological Institute developed a MOS system to forecast probabilities of (severe) thunderstorms in the Netherlands.

Scientists from the Meteorological Service of Canada developed a post-processing system called Updateable MOS (UMOS) that quickly incorporates changes to their regional NWP model without the need for a lengthy model archive. The Canadian UMOS system generates a 2-day forecast of temperatures, wind speed and direction and probability of precipitation (POP). UMOS temperature and wind forecasts are provided at 3-h intervals, and POP at 6-h intervals.

Scientists at the Kongju National University have also implemented a UMOS system to create forecasts of air temperatures over South Korea. It is unclear as to whether it is used operationally at the Korean Meteorological Administration.
