= Aviation Weather Center =

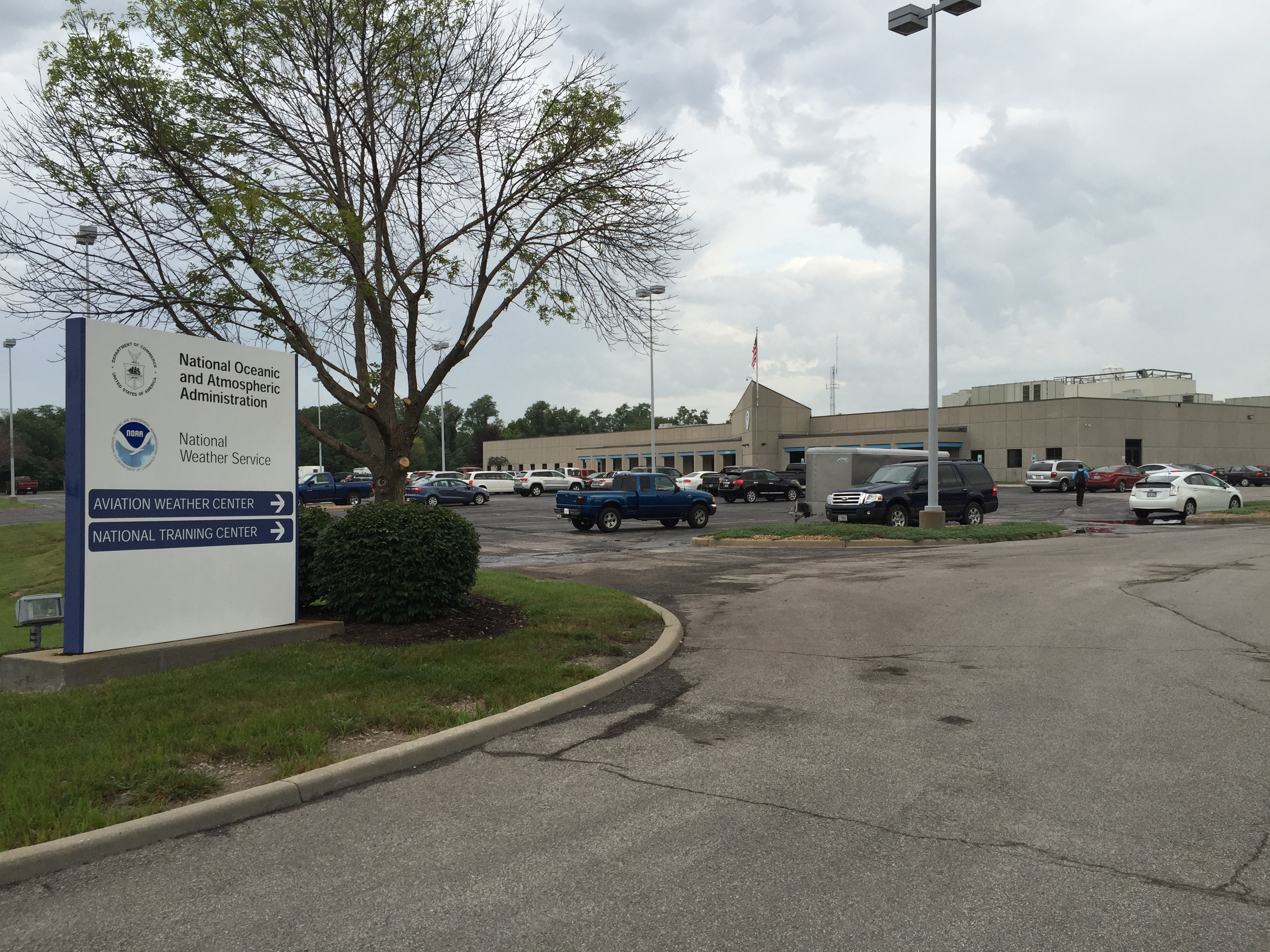
- Headquarters of the AWC

Agency overview
- Jurisdiction: Government of the United States
- Headquarters: Kansas City, Missouri; 39.276694°N 94.662575°W
- Parent agency: National Centers for Environmental Prediction
- Website: www.aviationweather.gov

The Aviation Weather Center (AWC) provides weather information and forecasts for air flights over United States territory and at certain altitudes for global traffic. It works with customers, such as commercial airlines, and international partners to improve flight safety and efficiency. It is one of the components of the National Centers for Environmental Prediction of the National Weather Service (NWS) of the United States.

== Responsibilities and Products ==
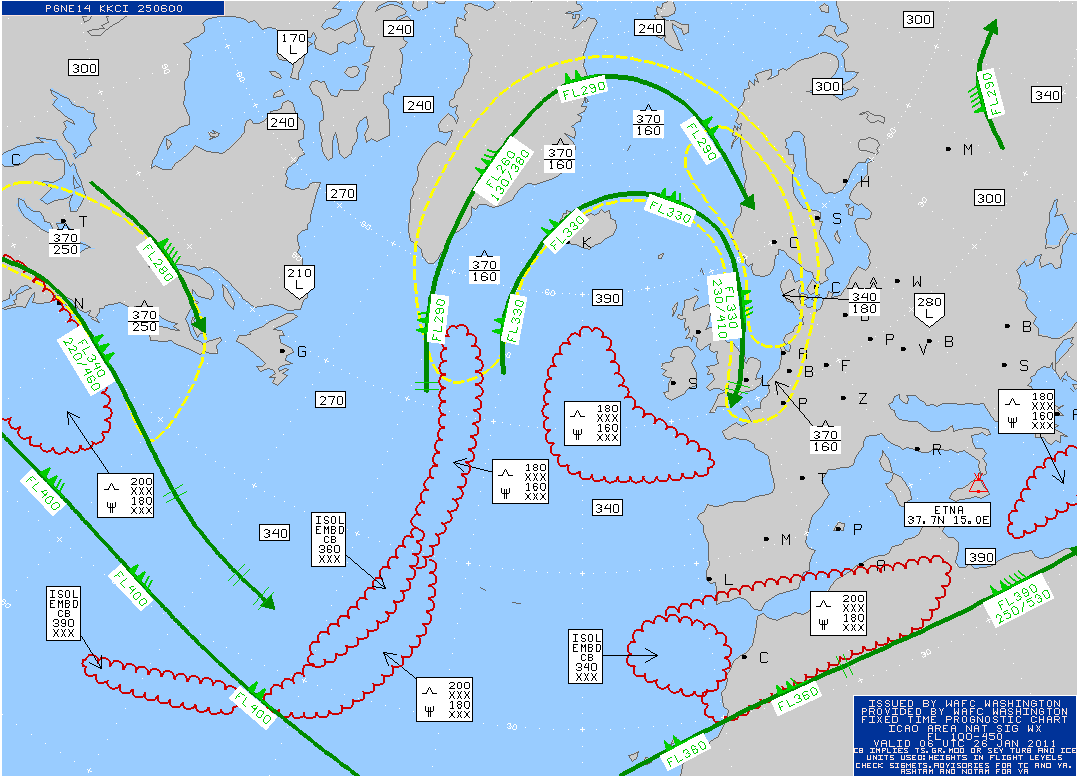
Significative weather map issued by the AWC of the US National Weather Service for transatlantic flights.

Each local NWS office issues Terminal aerodrome forecasts (TAFs) for airports under its area of responsibility. These forecasts are only valid for 10 nautical miles (18.5 km) around the airfield.

AWC forecasts, in text and chart, conditions over all of the continental United States from the surface to over 20 km altitude (Aviation Area forecast). These include freezing level, icing, wind and turbulence levels, cloudy areas and thunderstorms at various altitudes. It does the same for high altitudes 25,000 feet (7,600 m) around the world.

The AWC is also responsible for aviation warnings, such as AIRMETs and SIGMETs, for the United States, including its overseas territories, and northern portions of the Atlantic and Pacific Oceans. It is finally the center that issues forecasts for the displacement of volcanic ash and forest fire smoke plumes for the same territories.
