= George W. Platzman =

American meteorologist (1920–2008)

- Born: April 19, 1920; Chicago, Illinois, US
- Died: August 2, 2008 (aged 88); Chicago, Illinois, US
- Education: University of Chicago
- Spouse: Harriet M. Herschberger (m. 1945; died 1985)
- Scientific career
- Fields: Meteorology; Geophysical fluid dynamics
- Doctoral students: Norman A. Phillips

George William Platzman (April 19, 1920 – August 2, 2008) was an American meteorologist, known for his contributions to the study of geophysical fluid dynamics. He is recognized as a pioneer in the field of storm-surge forecasting.

== Biography ==
Platzman was born in Chicago, Illinois, on April 19, 1920. He studied mathematics and physics at the University of Chicago, and graduated in 1940. In 1941, he received his master's degree from the University of Arizona and then returned to the University of Chicago, where he taught meteorology to Air Corps cadets during World War II while simultaneously working on his Ph.D. He completed his Ph.D. in 1947. Platzman taught at the University of Chicago for nearly his entire career and was instrumental in advocating for the use of computers to analyze meteorological data.

Platzman died on August 2, 2008, of heart failure.
