= Geopotential height =

Type of altitude above mean sea level

Geopotential height, also known as geopotential altitude or geopotential elevation, is a vertical coordinate (with dimension of length) representing the work involved in lifting one unit of mass over one unit of length through a hypothetical space in which the acceleration of gravity is assumed constant. Geopotential heights are referenced to Earth's mean sea level, taking its best-fitting equigeopotential as a reference surface or vertical datum. In SI units, a geopotential height difference of one meter implies the vertical transport of a parcel of one kilogram; adopting the standard gravity value (9.80665 m/s^{2}), it corresponds to a constant work or potential energy difference of 9.80665 joules.

Geopotential height differs from geometric height (as given by a tape measure) because Earth's gravity is not constant, varying markedly with altitude and latitude; thus, a 1-m geopotential height difference implies a different vertical distance in physical space: "the unit-mass must be lifted higher at the equator than at the pole, if the same amount of work is to be performed". It is a useful concept in meteorology, climatology, and oceanography; it also remains a historical convention in aeronautics as the altitude used for calibration of aircraft barometric altimeters.

== Definition ==
Geopotential is the gravitational potential energy per unit mass at elevation $Z$:

$$\Phi(\phi,Z) = \int_0^Z\ g(\phi,Z)\,dZ$$

where $g(\phi,Z)$ is the acceleration due to gravity, $\phi$ is latitude, and $Z$ is the geometric elevation.

Geopotential height may be obtained from normalizing geopotential by the acceleration of gravity:

$${H} = \frac{\Phi}{g_{0}}\ = \frac{1}{g_{0}}\int_0^Z\ g(\phi,Z)\,dZ$$

where $g_0$ = 9.80665 m/s^{2}, the standard gravity at mean sea level. Expressed in differential form,

$${g_0}\ {dH} = {g}\ {dZ}$$

== Role in planetary fluids ==
Geopotential height plays an important role in atmospheric and oceanographic studies. The differential form above may be substituted into the hydrostatic equation and ideal gas law in order to relate pressure to ambient temperature and geopotential height for measurement by barometric altimeters regardless of latitude or geometric elevation:

$${dP} = {-g}\ {\rho}\ {dZ} = {-g_0}\ {\rho}\ {dH} = \frac{-g_0\ P}{R\ T}\ {dH}$$
$$\frac{dP}{P} = -\frac{g_0}{R\ T}\ {dH}$$

where $P$ and $T$ are ambient pressure and temperature, respectively, as functions of geopotential height, and $R$ is the specific gas constant. For the subsequent definite integral, the simplification obtained by assuming a constant value of gravitational acceleration is the sole reason for defining the geopotential altitude.

== Usage ==
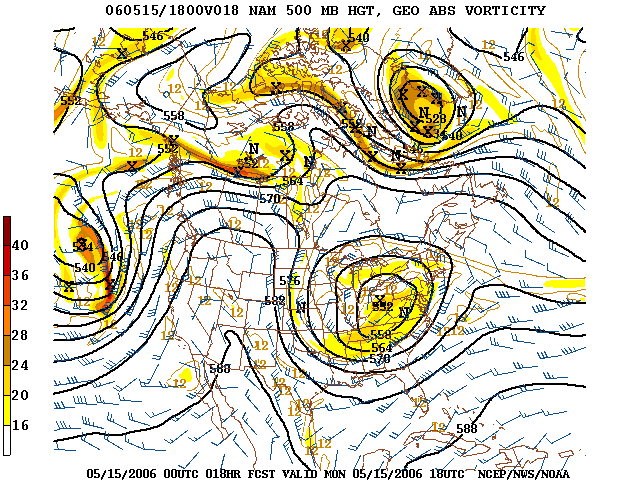
Geopotential height analysis on the North American Mesoscale Model (NAM) at 500 hPa.

Geophysical sciences such as meteorology often prefer to express the horizontal pressure gradient force as the gradient of geopotential along a constant-pressure surface, because then it has the properties of a conservative force. For example, the primitive equations that weather forecast models solve use hydrostatic pressure as a vertical coordinate, and express the slopes of those pressure surfaces in terms of geopotential height.

A plot of geopotential height for a single pressure level in the atmosphere shows the troughs and ridges (highs and lows) which are typically seen on upper air charts. The geopotential thickness between pressure levels – difference of the 850 hPa and 1000 hPa geopotential heights for example – is proportional to mean virtual temperature in that layer. Geopotential height contours can be used to calculate the geostrophic wind, which is faster where the contours are more closely spaced and tangential to the geopotential height contours.

The United States National Weather Service defines geopotential height as:

"...roughly the height above sea level of a pressure level. For example, if a station reports that the 500 mb [i.e. millibar] height at its location is 5600 m, it means that the level of the atmosphere over that station at which the atmospheric pressure is 500 mb is 5600 meters above sea level. This is an estimated height based on temperature and pressure data."

== See also ==
- Atmospheric model
- Above mean sea level
- Dynamic height, a similar quantity used in geodesy, based on a slightly different gravity value
