= Nested Grid Model =

Weather prediction model

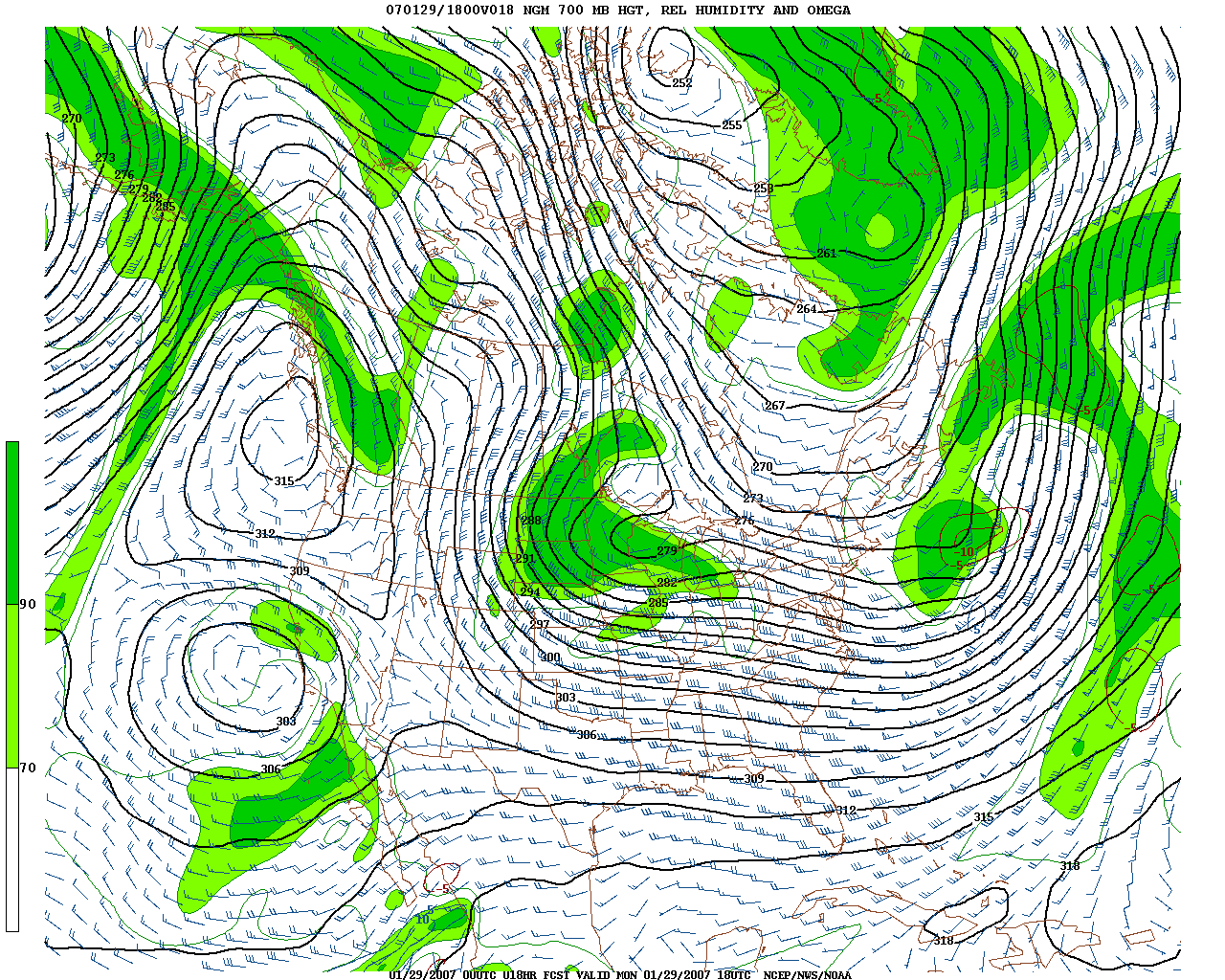
An example geopotential height and relative humidity forecast by the NGM

The Nested Grid Model (usually known as NGM for short) was a numerical weather prediction model run by the National Centers for Environmental Prediction, a division of the National Weather Service, in the United States. The NGM was, as its name suggested, derived from two levels of grids: a hemispheric-scale grid and a synoptic-scale grid, the latter of which had a resolution of approximately 90 kilometers. Its most notable feature was that it assumed the hydrostatic equation.

The NGM debuted in 1987, replacing the limited-area fine mesh (LFM) model. The NGM was also used to create model output statistics. Development of the model stopped in 1993. By 2000, the model was seen as obsolete, particularly for mesoscale features that were not hydrostatic, and was scheduled to be superseded by the Global Forecast System (GFS) in 2001. However, though the NGM ceased widespread use in the early 2000s due to the GFS and improvements in the Eta model (later the North American Mesoscale Model), and the NGM's short-range LAMP products were phased out in 2006, NGM MOS products continued to be in significant general use (alongside the Eta/NAM and GFS) until March 3, 2009, when the NGM MOS products were discontinued.
