= Rapid Refresh (weather prediction) =

Numerical weather prediction model

The Rapid Refresh or RAP is a numerical weather prediction (NWP) model. The model is run by the NOAA National Centers for Environmental Prediction (NCEP) to provide short-range hourly weather forecasts for North America. The model also serves as the boundary conditions for the higher-resolution High Resolution Rapid Refresh (HRRR) model, that uses a 3 km (1.9 mi) grid spacing on domains covering the contiguous United States and Alaska.

RAP is based on the framework of the Weather Research and Forecasting model (WRF); the Global Forecast System (GFS) provides the boundary parameters. The grid points are spaced every 13 kilometers (8.1 mi), with 50 vertical intervals extending up to the 10-hectopascal (10 mb) level of the atmosphere. RAP forecasts are initialized every three hours; forecasts starting at 00, 06, 12, and 18 UTC run for 21 hours, while forecasts starting at 03, 09, 15, and 21 UTC run for 51 hours.

The HRRR model runs once each hour, with new information being integrated every 15 minutes. HRRR forecasts are given hourly out to 18 hours, but forecasts starting at 00, 06, 12, and 18 UTC run for 48 hours.

An experimental version of the Rapid Refresh runs at the Earth System Research Laboratories (ESRL), a NOAA unit that develops models in the research stage prior to operational implementation at NCEP.

== History ==
The Rapid Refresh was officially made operational on 1 May 2012, replacing the Rapid Update Cycle (RUC). Version 1 of the HRRR was made operational on 30 Sept 2014. The most recent versions are RAP version 5 and HRRR version 4, both implemented on 2 Dec 2020.

== See also ==
- North American Mesoscale Model
- Rapid Refresh Forecast System
