= Frederick Gale Shuman =

Frederick Gale Shuman (July 13, 1919 – July 29, 2005) was an American pioneer in the development of operational numerical weather prediction. Shuman participated in the major events that brought computer forecasting from academic concepts to the foundation of weather prediction. He began his work in the early 1950s to discover numerical methods that give today's meteorologists the ability to issue extended weather forecasts and to predict severe weather conditions several days in advance.

== Biography ==
Frederick Gale Shuman was born in South Bend, Indiana and graduated from South Bend Central High School in 1937. His father worked at the Studebaker Motor Company in the design shop. Shuman earned a bachelor's degree in mathematics in 1941 from Ball State University in Muncie, Indiana, during which time he worked for the Weather Bureau as a junior weather observer at the Indianapolis Airport. He entered military service in June 1941, serving during World War II as a weather officer in North Africa and Italy. As part of his military training, Shuman received a master's degree in meteorology from Massachusetts Institute of Technology in 1942.

After the war, Shuman returned to the Weather Bureau, where he worked as an airways forecaster at Wayne County Airport. He again attended Massachusetts Institute of Technology and earned an ScD degree in meteorology. Shuman authored the first doctoral thesis on numerical weather prediction at Massachusetts Institute of Technology. He then moved to the Washington, D.C., area to do research on severe storm systems at the U.S. Weather Bureau.

The U.S. Weather Bureau sent him to the Institute for Advanced Study in Princeton, New Jersey, where his work on numerical weather prediction progressed. Shuman developed his mathematical models on one of the world's first computers, the JOHNNIAC. He also attended classes taught by J. Robert Oppenheimer and Albert Einstein.

In 1954, Shuman was assigned to the Joint Numerical Weather Prediction Unit. In 1958, the National Meteorological Center was established by merging the National Weather Analysis Center with the Joint Numerical Weather Prediction Unit. Shuman served as Chief of the National Meteorological Center Development Division.

Dr. Shuman became the director of the National Meteorological Center in April 1964 and served for an additional 17 years in the position until his retirement in January 1981.

== Awards ==
- 1980 The Second Half Century Award (Jule Gregory Charney Award) (shared with Dr. Andre Robert) for "scientific leadership in the construction of different and original operational primitive equations models that produced significant benefits to Canadian and U.S. weather services."
- 1967 Commerce Gold Medal.
- 1957 Commerce Silver Medal.
