= Weather Research and Forecasting Model =

Numerical weather prediction system

WRF model output showing simulated radar reflectivity (dBZ) for Typhoon Mawar at 3.3-km (2.1-mi) grid spacing. Time period is from 0000 UTC 22 August 2005 to 0000 UTC 24 August 2005.

The Weather Research and Forecasting (WRF) Model (/ˈwɔːrf/) is a numerical weather prediction (NWP) system designed to serve both atmospheric research and operational forecasting needs, developed in the United States. NWP refers to the simulation and prediction of the atmosphere with a computer model, and WRF is a set of software for this. WRF features two dynamical (computational) cores (or solvers), a data assimilation system, and a software architecture allowing for parallel computation and system extensibility. Its Advanced Research WRF (ARW) core uses the Arakawa C-grid, with the velocity components normal to the faces of each grid cell and the mass and thermodynamic variables at its center. The model serves a wide range of meteorological applications across scales ranging from meters to thousands of kilometers.

The effort to develop WRF began in the latter part of the 1990s and was a collaborative partnership principally among the National Center for Atmospheric Research (NCAR), the National Oceanic and Atmospheric Administration (represented by the National Centers for Environmental Prediction (NCEP) and the (then) Forecast Systems Laboratory (FSL)), the Air Force Weather Agency (AFWA), the Naval Research Laboratory (NRL), the University of Oklahoma (OU), and the Federal Aviation Administration (FAA). The bulk of the work on the model has been performed or supported by NCAR, NOAA, and AFWA.

WRF allows researchers to produce simulations reflecting either real data (observations, analyses) or idealized atmospheric conditions. WRF provides operational forecasting a flexible platform, while offering advances in physics, numerics, and data assimilation contributed by the many research community developers. WRF is currently in operational use at NCEP and other forecasting centers internationally. WRF has grown to have a large worldwide community of users (over 30,000 registered users in over 150 countries), and workshops and tutorials are held each year at NCAR. WRF is used extensively for research and real-time forecasting throughout the world. It has been shown to perform well in simulating atmospheric convection, but to be prone to producing squall lines too easily.

WRF offers two dynamical solvers for its computation of the atmospheric governing equations, and the variants of the model are known as WRF-ARW (Advanced Research WRF) and WRF-NMM (nonhydrostatic mesoscale model). The Advanced Research WRF (ARW) is supported to the community by the NCAR Mesoscale and Microscale Meteorology Laboratory. The WRF-NMM solver variant was based on the Eta model, and later nonhydrostatic mesoscale model, developed at NCEP. The WRF-NMM (NMM) is supported to the community by the Developmental Testbed Center (DTC).

The WRF serves as the basis for the RAP and HRRR models: high-resolution operational forecast models run regularly at NCEP. The WRF also serves as the basis for the North American Mesoscale (NAM) model at 12km and 3km grid resolutions.

A version of WRF-NMM tailored for hurricane forecasting, HWRF (hurricane weather research and forecasting), became operational in 2007.

In 2009, a polar optimized WRF was released through the Byrd Polar Research Center at the Ohio State University.

== See also ==
- Global Forecast System
