= North American Mesoscale Model =

Discontinued weather prediction model run by the U.S. National Weather Service

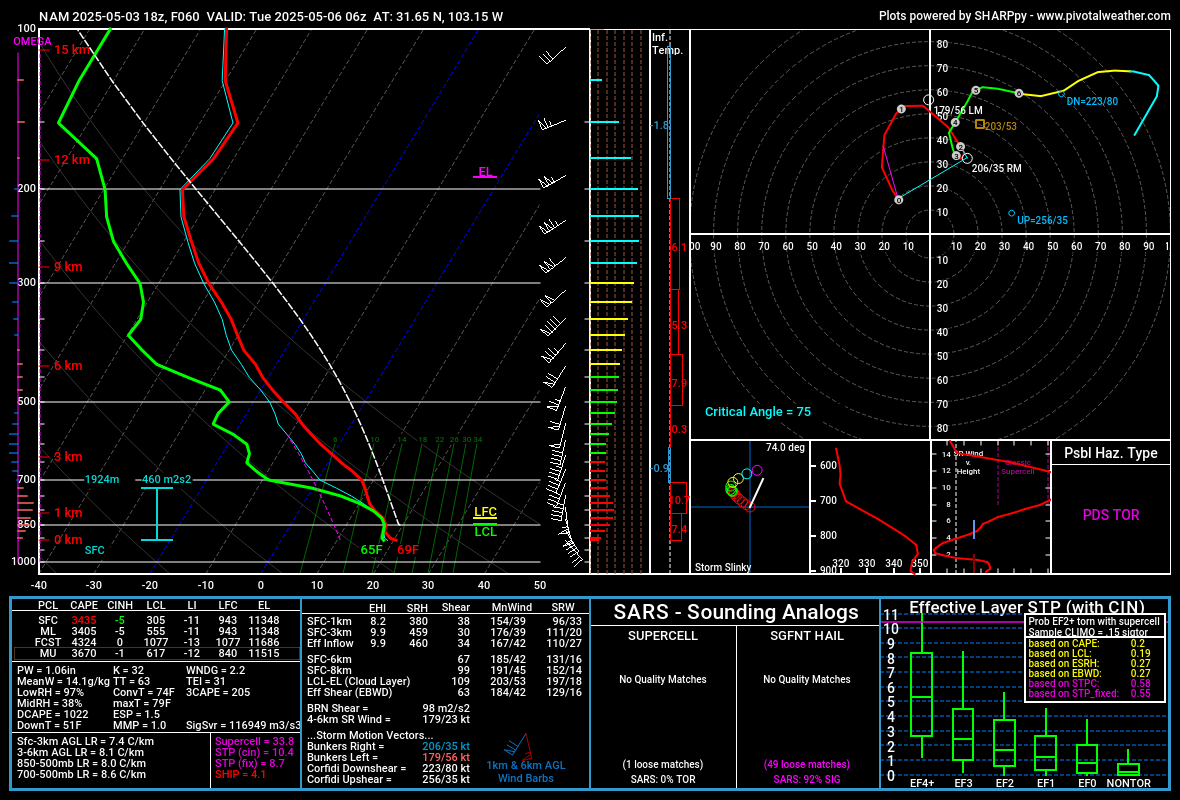
An example of a NAM-created model sounding

The North American Mesoscale Model (NAM) was a numerical weather prediction model run by National Centers for Environmental Prediction for short-term weather forecasting. The Weather Research and Forecasting Non-hydrostatic Mesoscale Model (WRF-NMM) model system served as the dynamical core of the NAM model. The WRF replaced the Eta model on June 13, 2006. The Eta model was defined on the Arakawa E-grid, a B-grid rotated by 45°. The NAM was run four times a day (00, 06, 12, 18 UTC) out to 84 hours, with 12 km horizontal resolution and with three-hour temporal resolution, providing finer detail than other operational forecast models. Its ensemble was known as the Short Range Ensemble Forecast (SREF) and runs out 87 hours. The NAM was superseded by the Rapid Refresh Forecast System (RRFS) on November 3, 2026.

== See also ==
- High Resolution Rapid Refresh (HRRR)
- Global Forecast System
- NEXRAD
