= National Centers for Environmental Prediction =

United States weather agency

National Centers for Environmental Prediction (NCEP)
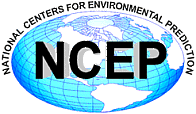

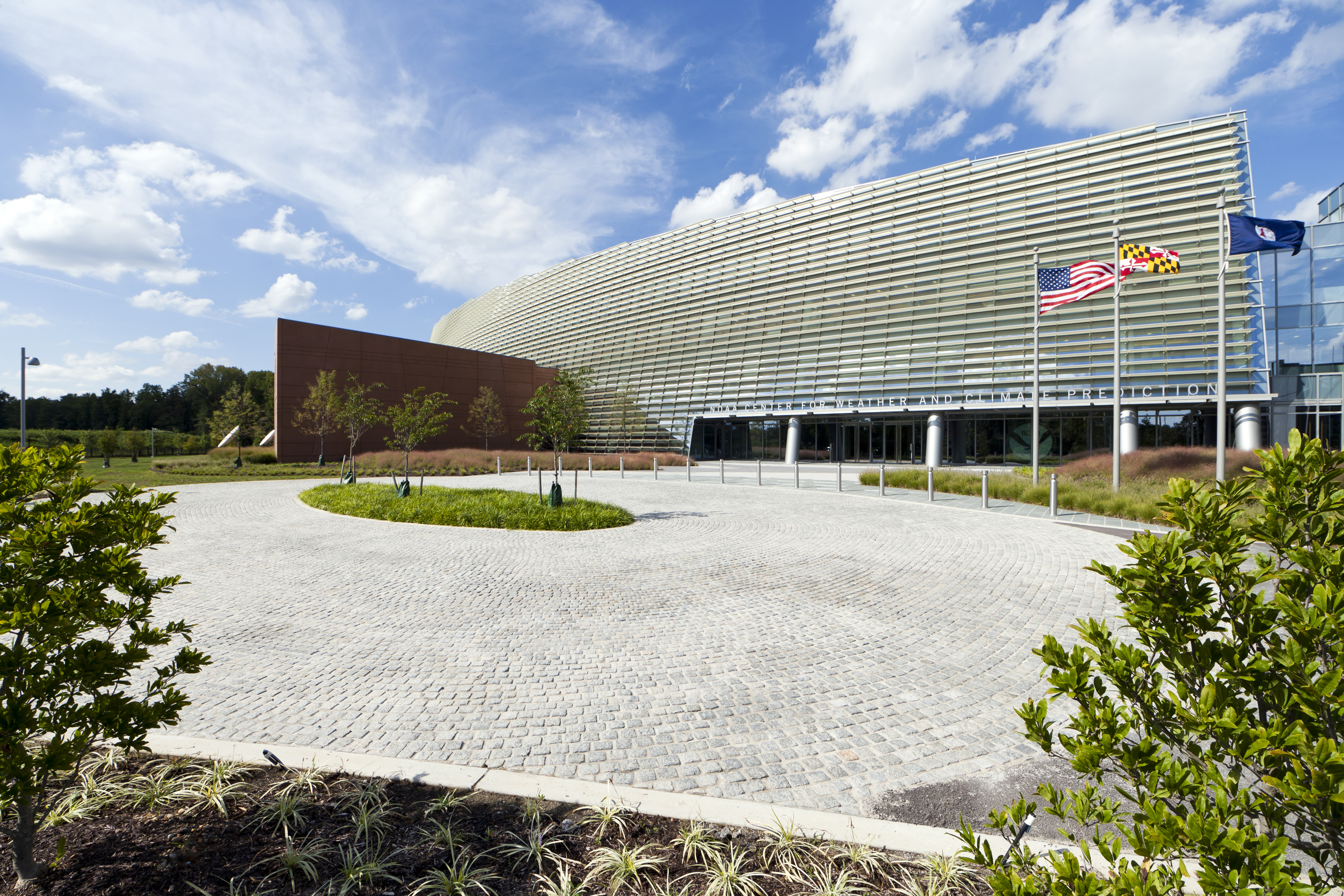

Agency overview
- Preceding agency: National Meteorological Center
- Jurisdiction: United States government
- Headquarters: College Park, Maryland
- Agency executive: Dr. Michael Farrar, director
- Parent department: National Weather Service
- Website: www.weather.gov/ncep

The United States National Centers for Environmental Prediction (NCEP) delivers national and global weather, water, climate, and space weather guidance, forecasts, warnings, and analyses to government agencies and private users. The centers form part of the National Weather Service.

NCEP consists of nine centers:

1. Aviation Weather Center provides aviation warnings and forecasts of hazardous flight conditions at all levels within domestic and international air space.
2. Climate Prediction Center monitors and forecasts short-term climate fluctuations and provides information on the effects climate patterns can have on the nation.
3. Environmental Modeling Center develops and improves numerical weather, climate, hydrological and ocean prediction through a broad program in partnership with the research community.
4. National Hurricane Center provides forecasts of the movement and strength of tropical weather systems and issues watches and warnings for the North Atlantic and the Eastern Pacific Ocean.
5. NCEP Central Operations sustains and executes the operational suite of numerical analyses and forecast models and prepares NCEP products for dissemination.
6. Ocean Prediction Center issues weather warnings and forecasts out to five days for the Atlantic and Pacific Oceans north of 30 degrees North.
7. Space Weather Prediction Center provides space weather alerts and warnings for disturbances that can affect people and equipment working in space and on earth.
8. Storm Prediction Center provides tornado and severe weather watches for the contiguous United States along with a suite of hazardous weather forecasts.
9. Weather Prediction Center provides nationwide analysis and forecast guidance products out through seven days.

== See also ==
- NOAA National Operational Model Archive and Distribution System (NOMADS)
