= Ensemble average (disambiguation) =

Ensemble average is a mean in statistical mechanics.

Ensemble average or ensemble averaging may also refer to:

- Ensemble averaging (machine learning)
- Process ensemble average, usage in econometrics and signal processing
- Ensemble (fluid mechanics), usage in fluid mechanics
- Ensemble forecasting, usage in weather forecasting
- Climate ensemble, usage in climatology

== See also ==
- Ensemble (disambiguation)
- Ensemble coding, a theory in cognitive neuroscience involving an average
- Replication (statistics)
- Resampling (statistics)
- Monte Carlo methods
