= Ensemble coding =

Theory in cognitive neuroscience

Ensemble coding, also known as ensemble perception or summary representation, is a theory in cognitive neuroscience about the internal representation of groups of objects in the human mind. Ensemble coding proposes that such information is recorded via summary statistics, particularly the average or variance. Experimental evidence tends to support the theory for low-level visual information, such as shapes and sizes, as well as some high-level features such as face gender. Nonetheless, it remains unclear the extent to which ensemble coding applies to high-level or non-visual stimuli, and the theory remains the subject of active research.

== Theory ==
Extensive amounts of information are available to the visual system. Ensemble coding is a theory that suggests that people process the general gist of their complex visual surroundings by grouping objects together based on shared properties. The world is filled with redundant information of which the human visual system has become particularly sensitive. The brain exploits this redundancy and condenses the information. For example, the leaves of a tree or blades of grass give rise to the percept of 'tree-ness' and 'lawn-ness'. It has been demonstrated that individuals have the ability to quickly and accurately encode ensembles of objects, like leaves on a tree, and gather summary statistical information (like the mean and variance) from groups of stimuli. Some research suggests that this process provides rough visual information from the entire visual field, giving way to a complete and accurate picture of the visual world. Although the individual details of this accurate picture might be inaccessible, the 'gist' of the scene remains accessible. Ensemble coding is an adaptive process that lightens the cognitive load in the processing and storing of visual representations through the use of heuristics.

== Operational definition ==
David Whitney and Allison Yamanashi Leib have developed an operational and flexible definition stating that ensemble coding should cover the following five concepts:

- Ensemble perception is the ability to discriminate or reproduce a statistical moment.
- Ensemble perception requires the integration of multiple items.
- Ensemble information at each level of representation can be precise relative to the processing of single objects at that level.
- Single-item recognition is not a prerequisite for ensemble coding.
- Ensemble representations can be extracted with a temporal resolution at or beyond the temporal resolution of individual object recognition.

== Opposing theories ==
Some research has found countering evidence to the theory of ensemble coding.

=== Limited visual capacity ===
Vision science has noted that although humans take in large amounts of visual information, adults are only able to process, attend to, and retain up to roughly four items from the visual environment. Furthermore, scientists have found that this visual upper limit capacity exists across various phenomena including change blindness, object tracking, and feature representation.

=== Low resolution representations and limited capacity ===
Additional theories in vision science propose that stimuli are represented in the brain individually as small, low resolution, icons stored in templates with limited capacities and are organized through associative links.

== History ==
Throughout its history, ensemble coding been known by many names. Interest in the theory began to emerge in the early 20th century. In its earliest years, ensemble coding was known as Gestalt grouping. In 1923, Max Wertheimer, a Gestalt psychology theorist, was addressing how humans perceive their visual world holistically rather than individually. Gestaltists argued that in object perception, the individual object features were either lost or difficult to perceive and therefore the grouped object was the favored percept. Although Gestaltists helped define some of the central principles of object perception, research into modern ensemble coding did not occur until many years later.

In 1971, Norman Anderson was one of the earliest to conduct explicit ensemble coding research. Anderson's research into social ensemble coding showed that individuals described by two positive terms were rated more favorably than individuals described by two positive terms and two negative terms. This research on impression formation demonstrated that a weighted mean or average captures how information is integrated rather than the summation. Additional research during this time explored ensemble coding in group attractiveness, shopping preferences, and the perceived badness of criminals.

== The current era ==
Findings by Dan Ariely in 2001 were the first data to support the modern theories of ensemble coding. Ariely used novel experimental paradigms, which he labeled "mean discrimination" and "member identification", to examine how sets of objects are perceived. He conducted three studies involving shape ensembles that varied in size. Across all studies, participants were able to accurately encode the mean size of the ensemble of objects, but they were inaccurate when asked if a certain object was a part of the set. Ariely's findings were the first that found statistical summary information emerge in the visual perception of grouped objects.

Consistent with Ariely's findings, follow-up research conducted by Sang Chul Chong and Anne Treisman in 2003 provided evidence that participants are engaging in summary statistical processes. Their research revealed that participant's maintained high accuracy in encoding the mean size of the stimuli even with short stimuli presentations as low as 50 milliseconds, memory delays, and object distribution differences.

Additional research has demonstrated that ensemble coding is not limited to the mean size of objects in the ensemble, but that additional content is extracted, such as average line orientation, average spatial location, average number, and statistical summaries such as the variances are detected. Observers are also able to extract accurate perceptual summaries of high-level features such as the average direction of eye gaze of grouped faces and the average walking direction of a crowd.

== Levels of ensemble coding ==
People have the ability to encode ensembles of objects along various dimensions. These dimensions have been divided into levels that vary from low-level to high-level feature information.

=== Low-level feature information ===
Low-level ensemble coding has been observed in various psychophysical areas of research. For example, people accurately perceive the average size of objects, motion direction of grouped dots, number, line orientation, and spatial location.

=== High-level feature information ===
High-level ensemble coding extends to more complex, higher level objects including faces.

=== Independence of low- and high-level information ===
Some findings suggest lower-level and higher-level information may be processed by independent cognitive mechanisms

== Social vision and ensemble coding ==
Based on the early work of Anderson, it appears that humans integrate semantic as well as social information into memory using ensemble coding. These findings suggest that social processes may hinge on the same sort of underlying mechanisms that allow people to perceive average object orientation and average object direction of motion.

In recent years, ensemble coding in the field of social vision has emerged. Social vision is a field of research that examines how people perceive one another. With the addition of ensemble coding, the field is able to explore people perception, or how people perceive groups of other people. This specific research area focuses on how observers accurately perceive and extract social information from groups and how that extracted information influences downstream judgments and behaviors. In 2018, seminal research introducing the use ensemble coding in the field of social vision was conducted by Briana Goodale. Goodale's research found that humans can accurately extract sex ratio summaries from ensembles of faces and that this sex ratio provides an early visual cue signaling sense of belonging and fit within group. Specifically, this research found that participants felt a stronger sense of belonging to a given ensemble as members of their own sex increased in the perceived ensemble.

Additional research has uncovered that in as little as 75 milliseconds, participants are able to derive the average sex ratio of an ensemble of faces. Furthermore, within that 75 milliseconds, participants were able to form impressions based on the perceived sex ratio and make inferences about the group's perceived threat. Specifically, this research found that groups were judged as more threatening as the ratio of men to women increased.

In 2023, researchers found that people can accurately gauge the average trustworthiness of multiple faces presented together, even at very brief exposure times (as short as 250 ms). The findings suggest that our brains efficiently extract a summary statistic of facial features from crowds, enabling quick social judgments that may influence behavior.
