= Compensator =

Compensator can refer to:

- Pressure control on a piston pump
- An alternative term for pipeline expansion joints
- A muzzle brake, used to counter the recoil of a firearm, or to prevent the muzzle from climbing due to kickback from the rapid firing of an automatic or semi-automatic weapon
- A device that offsets or counterbalances a destabilising factor: See
  - Buoyancy compensator (diving)
  - Buoyancy compensator (aviation)
  - Static VAR compensator
  - Heisenberg compensator, key part of a Transporter (Star Trek)
  - Lead-lag compensator
- Motion compensator
- Optical compensator, also known as a wave plate or a retarder
- another term for the dual-predictable projection of a Point process
- Compensator (Control Theory)
