= Transience =

Transience or transient may refer to:

== Music ==
- Transient (album), a 2004 album by Gaelle
- Transience (Steven Wilson album), 2015
- Transience (Wreckless Eric album)

== Science and engineering ==
- Transient state, when a process variable or variables have been changed and the system has not yet reached a steady state.
- Transient modelling, a way of looking at a process with the primary criterion of time, observing the pattern of changes in the subject being studied over time.
- Transient response, the response of a system to a change from an equilibrium or a steady state.
- Transient (acoustics), a high-amplitude, short-duration sound at the beginning of a waveform
- Transient (astronomy), an astronomical object or phenomenon of short duration
- Transient (civil engineering), any pressure wave that is short lived
- Transient (computer programming), a property of any element in the system that is temporary
  - transient, a keyword in the Java language
- Transient (oscillation), a short-lived burst of energy caused by a sudden change of state
- Transient climate simulation, a mode of running a global climate model (GCM) so that the climate of the model represents a realistic mode of possible change in the real world.

== Other uses ==
- "Transience" (short story), by Arthur C. Clarke
- TRANSIENT, a US secret program to intercept Soviet satellite transmissions
- Transient, a 2005 short film by Australian director Craig Boreham
- Transients, a term for some homeless people
- "Transients", title short story in the 1993 collection Transients and Other Disquieting Stories by Darrell Schweitzer

== See also ==
- Impermanence, an essential doctrine of Buddhism
- Mono no aware, a feeling of transience in Japanese culture
- Temporality, the linear progression of past, present, and future
