= Ensemble =

Ensemble may refer to:

== Art ==
- Architectural ensemble
- Ensemble (Kendji Girac album), 2015
- Ensemble (Ensemble album), 2006
- Ensemble (band), a project of Olivier Alary
- Ensemble cast (drama, comedy)
- Ensemble (musical theatre), also known as the chorus
- Ensemble (Stockhausen), 1967 group-composition project by Karlheinz Stockhausen
- Musical ensemble

== Mathematics and science ==
- Distribution ensemble or probability ensemble (cryptography)
- Ensemble Kalman filter
- Ensemble learning (statistics and machine learning)
- Ensembl genome database project
- Neural ensemble, a population of nervous system cells (or cultured neurons) involved in a particular neural computation
- Statistical ensemble (mathematical physics)
  - Climate ensemble
  - Ensemble average (statistical mechanics)
  - Ensemble averaging (machine learning)
  - Ensemble (fluid mechanics)
  - Ensemble forecasting (meteorology)
  - Quantum statistical mechanics, the study of statistical ensembles of quantum mechanical systems

== Technology ==
- DAB ensemble, a group of Digital Audio Broadcasting broadcasters transmitting multiple digital radio channels on a single radio transmission
- Geoworks Ensemble, a computer operating system.

== Companies and organizations ==
- Ensemble Studios, a disbanded Microsoft-owned company in the computer and video game industry
- Ensemble Theatre, a theatre company in Australia
- The Ensemble Theatre, a theatre company in Houston, Texas

== Politics ==
- Ensemble!, a political party in France
- Ensemble, a political coalition in France led by Renaissance

== Events ==
- "Ensemble", the annual conference held at XLRI School of Business and Human Resources, India
