= Yaacov Schul =

Israeli professor of cognitive and social psychology

- יעקב שול
- Born: 1951 (age 74–75)
- Education: Hebrew University of Jerusalem (B.A.); University of Michigan (Ph.D.)
- Occupations: Professor of cognitive and social psychology
- Employer: Hebrew University of Jerusalem

Yaacov Schul (Hebrew: יעקב שול; born 1951) is an Israeli professor of cognitive and social psychology at the Hebrew University of Jerusalem.

== Biography ==
Prof. Schul received his B.A. in Psychology and Mathematics in 1976 from the Hebrew University, and his Ph.D. in Social Psychology in 1981 from the University of Michigan. He has been professor of social psychology at the Hebrew University since 1981, and held various positions at the Hebrew University, including vice rector. He is married, a father of two and a grandfather of four.

== Research contributions ==
Schul's theoretical orientation within Psychology is Social Cognition. His early research explored the process of impression formation in an attempt to characterize the operations involved according to their sensitivity to different features of the information, to investigate how each of these operations influence the representation in memory of the original information, and to explore how these representations influence different kinds of judgments. The early work evolved into two lines of research. The first explored the process by which people evaluate their own activity and the activity of others. The second line of studies examined the conditions under which people can successfully ignore invalid information. The research on discounting developed into the study of distrust, negation processing, and research on reliance on weak internal cues such as metacognitive experiences.

=== Processing of negations ===
In collaboration with Mayo, Schul studies the negation processes and their consequences, suggesting the existence of two basic negation models: One ("The Schema-Plus-Tag model") explains the possible failure of the negation process, while the other ("The Fusion model") proposes a successful negation. The work with Yaniv highlighted the implications of acceptance versus rejection to decision-making outcomes. Schul's recent studies concern the similarities and differences between negation processes that are triggered by communicated negations (e.g., “Honey is not made by butterflies”) and by false information (e.g., “Honey is made by butterflies”) in an attempt to understand people's sensitivity to misinformation.

=== Trust and Distrust and reliance on gut feelings ===
Past research highlighted many biases that stem from reliance on gut feelings. Schul's research suggests that such reliance is not ubiquitous. Schul, Mayo and Burnstein distinguished a mindset of trust from a mindset of distrust. In a series of studies they demonstrated that whereas a mindset of trust is associated with reliance on gut feelings and activation of congruent associations; a mindset of distrust, triggers thinking about incongruent associations and more willingness to consider alternative positions. The research with Yahalom further shows that suspicion in people's motivation weakens reliance on the metacognitive cues associated with ease of retrieval. The research with Shidlovski and Mayo explored a particularly important type of gut feeling: the sense of truth. This feeling can be triggered by mental representations that have flow characteristics similar to experienced events. It is found that even after acknowledging an experience as false, people still can associate such experience with markers of implicit truth.

=== Processing of weak cues ===
The research with Eitam and Hassin indicates that sensitivity to weak cues depends on the usefulness of these cues to one's goals. The research by Milyavsky, Hassin, and Schul extended these findings to information presented subliminally. The research with Yahalom shows the importance of contextual fit.

In a mainly theoretical article, Keren & Schul critically examined the viability of two-system frameworks that have recently surged in the psychological literature. The article offers a critical evaluation of the conceptual underpinnings of two-system models and scrutinizes the assumptions underlying these models. In their conclusion, Keren & Schul encouraged researchers to adopt more rigorous conceptual approach and more stringent criteria for testing the empirical evidence in support of psychological theories.
