= Indignation =

Emotion

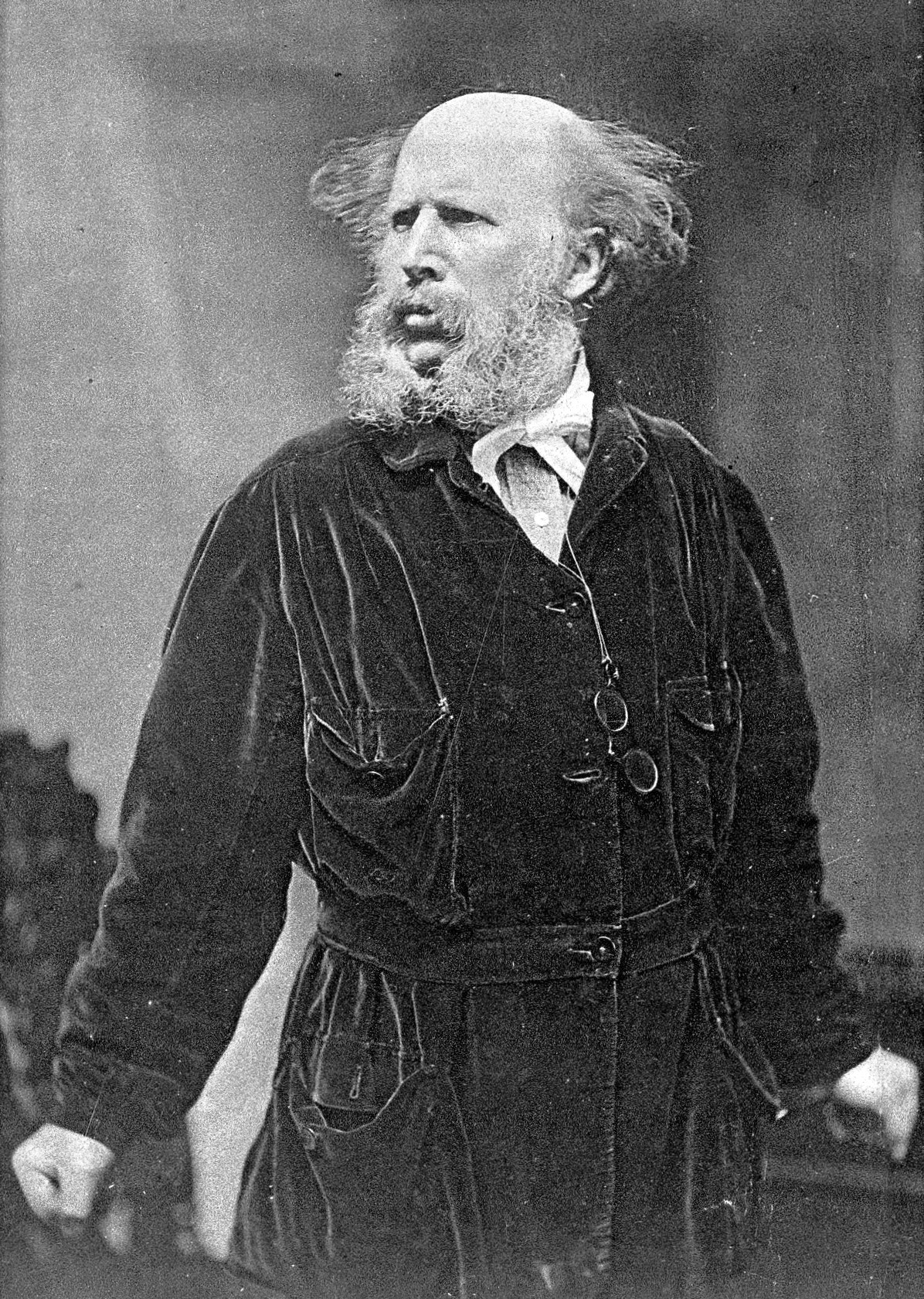
A man "shrugging the shoulders", simulating indignation, from Darwin, Charles (1872). The Expression of the Emotions in Man and Animals. London: John Murray. pp. 264–265.

Indignation is a complex and discrete emotion that is triggered by social emotions and social environments. The Standard Dictionary describes indignation as a "feeling involving anger mingled with contempt or disgust".

The feeling of indignation can occur when one is mistreated by another or negative feelings are sparked when a situation is out of the normal realm of society. When situations or actions that are considered to be unjust behavior occur, the feeling of indignation is experienced. With unjust actions and behaviors comes to blame. Blame also helps to make up the emotion of indignation. When blameworthy actions take place, the emotion of indignation occurs and negative feelings are projected onto the person who is to blame. Which can be brought on by disturbances that go against social normatives. According to Claude Miller, "indignation is defined as a non-primary, discrete, social emotion, specifying disapproval of someone else's blameworthy action, as that action is explicitly viewed to be in violation of the objective order, and implicitly perceived as injurious to the perceiver's self-concept". Indignation is experienced when violations are made to our daily lives. Indignation is an emotion that is considered to be an adaptive behavior. Social environment and social emotions being a stimuli for indignation. Our emotions and behaviors adapt depending on certain situations. Internal and external social norms play a part in experiencing the emotion of indignation. It is expected that everyone coexists and follows the social normative behaviors society has put in place. When something disrupts what is considered to be a social norm, a violation occurs, both internally and externally. A range of feelings are experienced internally, as well as a desire to be removed from the situation externally. When norms are disrupted, offense is taken and the emotion of indignation is ignited.

The attribution process is integral in the development of indignation. It is the split-second assessments a person makes (attributions) about their own behavior or in the behavior of others in order to figure out the reason or cause behind it. Behaviors can be classified as situational (external) or dispositional (internal). Fritz Heider wrote that people tend to view behavior in one of two ways; the cause of situational factors or of dispositional factors. From this, an individual is either an Entity theorist or an Incremental theorist when considering event or categorization but is not exclusive to either group. According to one scholar, "People's implicit theories create a framework for processing information, forming inferences, determining attributions, shaping predictions, understanding others' behaviors, and construction representations of social events". Taking this into account and based on a person's classification of entity or incremental theorist (which delineates how a person views behavior in relation to its driving factors), research demonstrates that said person is inclined to experience indignation with more or less frequency and severity respectively.

== Entity theory ==
Entity theorists believe that judgements of moral character can be made from merely a few or even a single observation(s). They are most often found making stereotypes about people or events, and believe that disposition based attributions are innate, and rarely ever change. 'You can't teach an old dog new tricks' explains how entity theorists might explain a situation. Behavior, to them, is caused by the unchanging, internal (character) attributes. Hypothetically, if the two different types of people were sitting on a parole board for a jailed criminal, those who exemplify traits of entity theorists might say 'once a criminal always a criminal' and reason that the criminal behavior was driven by the immoral nature of the person and they would do it again, no matter the circumstance, when given the opportunity.

Dispositional traits are used within the entity theory as a basic unit of analysis. Either positive or negative attributes are experienced and possibly expressed. With indignation, the attributes experienced are going to be negative. These tendencies are most likely going to remain the same and be predictable with little to no room for change. An assumption is made and judgments are carried out. Entity theory creates and holds judgements based on a single behavioral observation. Once something is believed to be true, it is almost permanently labeled, and objective situational evidence is neglected to be taken into consideration. Disposition-relevant information is the main focus due to the fact that it feeds the reinforcement of negative information.

== Incremental theory ==
Incremental theorists believe just the opposite position of some entity theorists. They can make judgements of moral character more based on changing external factors (situational) and factors such as effort, desire such as goals. When formulating judgements, incremental theorists take recent evidence into account and avoid broad character attributions. For example, those of those who are considered to be incremental theorists might argue that, the aforementioned criminal's behavior, was possibly the subsequent result of a poor upbringing or was drug induced, and while, in prison, the incarcerated changed his/her lifestyle through exemplary behavior and service to others. Thus they would not be a threat to the public anymore, in theory.

=== Defensive Attribution Theory ===
Defensive Attribution Theory aims at describing how an individual ultimately wants to explain behavior in a way that protects their ego and is flattering to the self. Attributions are deemed as biased because an individual, in explaining behavior, will "take credit for good outcomes and avoid responsibility for the bad". In this, a person is trying to exert a varying degree of control over their environment. It should be easier to distort one's judgments of dissimilar others—with whom one does not readily identify—than with similar others—with whom one not only more readily identifies, but from whom one should also expect a greater measure of empathy. Moreover, since entity theory promotes internal characterological attributions, we should expect entity theorists to be more sensitive and defensive with regard to perceptions of similarity than incremental theorists.

==== Actor-Observer Effect ====
The actor-observer effect is when an individual ascribes personal successes as the cause of factors concerning disposition, e.g. "I, the student, did well on the test because I studied hard", and personal failures as the cause of situational factors, e.g. "I, the student, did poorly on the test because the test questions were very difficult". The opposite is true of when an individual is assessing the behavior of others. When the actor views an observer, i.e. other people, succeeding, they will believe that the success was the result of situational factors. The classmate did well on the test because the questions were easy. If the actor sees the observer experience failure, the actor will say that it was because of something, usually negative, that deals with the observer's disposition. The classmate did poorly because he/she is lazy and did not study.

== Applications ==
Indignation has been applied in many different settings.

=== In politics ===
Indignation plays a significant role in politics. This is because politicians hold the power to offend many people based the decisions that they make. The decisions that politicians make impact hundreds, thousands, or millions of people. Certain decisions they make may cause many constituents to feel indignant because they feel like those decisions go against what they stand for or believe in, especially if the constituents belong to the same party as the politician. Politicians themselves also feel indignant because if people are not in favor of their policies or are competing against them, they will attack their self-construct. For example, this can be seen when politicians are debating. The other politician typically questions their policies and procedures in hopes to make their competition feel indignant. By doing this, the hope would be that the debate would be stifled.

It has been stated that indignation provides the capacity to think through certain situations. The person feeling indignant wants to think about why they are feeling indignant so that they can figure out an appropriate response and pin-point whatever caused them to feel indignant. It has been stated that "when indignation does not express itself immediately as violence, it becomes an investigation of (and what he believes is a more appropriate response to) whatever has caused it"

=== In Christianity ===
Righteous indignation is typically a reactive emotion of anger over perceived mistreatment, insult, or malice. It is akin to a sense of injustice. In some Christian doctrines, righteous indignation is considered the only form of anger which is not sinful, e.g., when Jesus drove the money lenders out of the temple in the Gospel of Matthew.

The Forerunner Commentary on Psalms 137:2–6 argues that these psalms are about the "bitterness of exile into which God forced Judah", purportedly with the goal of turning grief into zeal, so that the "anger can be used to scour away sin" by becoming "righteously indignant". In John W. Ritenbaugh's comments on Proverbs 15:18 in How to Survive Exile, he argues that it "is alright for us to be righteously indignant as long as we do not sin."

Daniel Whitby argues that "anger is not always sinful", in that it is found among non-sinners. For example, Jesus was "angry with the Pharisees for the hardness of their hearts; yet He had no desire to revenge this sin upon them, but had a great compassion for them".

== See also ==
- Outrage
- Social emotions
- Moral emotions

== Sources ==
Claude H. Miller, Judee K. Burgoon, and John R. Hall (2007). "The Effects of Implicit Theories of Moral Character on Affective Reactions to Moral Transgressions." Social Cognition: Vol. 25, No. 6, pp. 819–832.
