= Implicit personality theory =

Implicit personality theory describes the specific patterns and biases an individual uses when forming impressions based on a limited amount of initial information about an unfamiliar person. While there are parts of the impression formation process that are context-dependent, individuals also tend to exhibit certain tendencies in forming impressions across a variety of situations. There is not one singular implicit personality theory utilized by all; rather, each individual approaches the task of impression formation in his or her own unique way. However, there are some components of implicit personality theories that are consistent across individuals, or within groups of similar individuals. These components are of particular interest to social psychologists because they have the potential to give insight into what impression one person will form of another.

== Origins ==
One of the first psychologists to extensively explore the concept of impression formation was Solomon Asch. His research, dating back to the mid-1940s, provided a substantial amount of the initial data explaining factors that affect impression formation. He was particularly interested in the differences between central and peripheral traits. Many of the ideas produced from Asch's experiments are still relevant to the study of impression formation, and have played a significant role in establishing a foundation for modern implicit personality theory research.

Asch believed that the traits a person portrays all dynamically interact with each other to form another person's impression of them. This is contrary to an additive model of impression which suggests that a general impression of a person is created which consists of the sum of their traits. Asch focused on establishing how impressions are formed holistically rather than just being a collection of individual traits. In his initial study on impression formation, Asch establishes several main points including this dynamic interaction of traits, the existence of central traits indicating that not all traits are equally weighted when forming an impression, as well as claiming that traits are representative of an entire person and that the same trait between two people can be drastically different depending on the other traits that they possess. In Asch's initial experiments developing implicit personality theory, he established several main points about the impression formation of an individual.

1. An impression is formed of the entire person, not just part of the individual. The formation of the impression in an attempt to describe the core of the person.
2. Once multiple traits are assigned to an individual, they are immediately no longer 2 separate traits, but instead the traits dynamically interact to more completely describe the individual
3. Not all traits are weighted evenly. Central traits have the most influence on impression formation.
4. A single trait has an impact on many if not all traits of an individual and traits cannot be isolated.
5. Each trait describes the entire individual - not just a small part of them
6. Each trait functions as a representative of the person
7. The portrayal of a trait depends on the surrounding environments/dynamic interaction between the other traits of an individual. "The envy of a proud man is, for example, seen to have a different basis from the envy of a modest man"
8. Traits can cooperate or contradict with each other. The impression formed is an attempt to piece together consistencies of an individual to generate something complete.
9. The value of a trait depends heavily on the context of the person and their surrounding traits. A trait may be central to one individual while only secondary to another.

== Automaticity ==
One of the most notable characteristics of implicit personality theories is that they are, in fact, implicit. In this context, "implicit" is taken to mean "automatic". It is a common belief that much of the process of social perception actually is automated. For example, it is possible for a person to experience automatic thought processes, and for those processes occur without that person's intention or awareness of their occurrence. In terms of impression formation, this means that an observer may perceive another person's behavior and automatically make trait inferences from that behavior, without being aware that these inferences were being made. The strongest evidence for the implicitness of impression formation comes from observed "savings effects" when trying to learn another person's traits. In a study by Carlston & Skowronski (1994), participants who were exposed to descriptive stimuli containing implied trait information learned the target person's traits more easily than participants who had not been previously exposed to implied trait information. Moreover, this effect could not be accounted for by simple priming mechanisms. The participants exhibited a true savings effect, which suggested that they had gained implicit trait information from the descriptive stimuli. Some theorists also argue that implicit personality theories act as personal belief systems guiding how individuals interpret social information additionally to being automatic perceptual mechanisms. Under this perspective Implicit Personality Theory influence depends on both availability of previous trait beliefs as well as the accessibility of the beliefs in a situation. Factors like motivation, context, and stereotype activation can all determine which trait concepts have the largest impact on impression formation. These findings demonstrate Implicit Personality Theories not being a fixed set of trait association rules but flexible structures with varying effects across situations.

== General theories ==
=== Consistency theory ===
Consistency, in terms of implicit personality theories, refers to the way in which a newly formed impression relates to what is already known about the other person. There are two dimensions of consistency involved in inferring traits with respect to the other known traits of a person. Evaluative consistency suggests that inferred traits will match the overall impression of the person formed by the traits of that person that have already been established. For instance, there is a tendency to infer favorable traits in people who have already exhibited mostly favorable traits. Likewise, evaluative consistency implies that if a person is understood to have mostly unfavorable traits, others will likely attribute other unfavorable traits to that individual. On the other hand, descriptive consistency suggests that trait inferences about a person occur when there are similarities between the descriptive attributes of the person and the assumed trait. An example of two traits that are descriptively similar are "skeptical" and "distrustful". An observer using descriptive similarity to form an impression of a "skeptical" person would most likely also believe that person to be "distrustful", because these two traits similarly describe a person who questions what other people tell him.

Both dimensions of consistency can be used to form impressions and infer traits; one is not more "correct" than the other. Most likely they are used in sequence, with descriptive consistency used before evaluative consistency is enacted. A study by Felipe (1970) revealed that, after traits that exhibit both evaluative and descriptive consistency, traits that are descriptively but not evaluatively consistent ("stingy" and "firm") are assumed to co-occur more often than traits that show evaluative but not descriptive consistency ("stingy" and "over permissive"). However, evaluative consistency is preferred in scenarios when making a quick, "all-or-nothing" judgment is necessary.

Complementary research suggests implicit personality theories as holistic belief systems varying across individuals, similar to personality traits. These beliefs guide how people interpret information of others, impacting not only what traits are expected of the person but also how impactful that trait information is overall to the perception of the person. While these beliefs often appear as stable, the level of influence is dependent on the situation and can adjust based on goals, attention, or context cues. This framework views implicit personality theories as a broad lens people interpret social information through, as opposed to a fixed set of rules on how traits connect to each other.

=== Attribution theory ===
Attribution theory describes how people view trait stability in another person. This theory does not deal exclusively with traits, but rather describes a general worldview a person takes in life. The two main attribute theories are entity theory and incremental theory. People who exhibit entity theory tend to believe that traits are fixed and stable over time and across situations. When making judgments about a person's behavior, they are inclined to emphasize the traits of that person. Moreover, entity theorists tend to make assumptions about others' traits based on a limited sample of their behaviors. Incremental theorists believe that traits are more dynamic and can vary over time. They also place less significance on traits when interpreting another person's actions, focusing rather on other types of mediators that may be influencing their behavior. The biggest distinguishing factor between these two theories is that entity theorists tend to make stronger and broader inferences from traits than incremental theorists do. This distinction holds true even when there are situational explanations for the observed behavior, and when the behavior is unintentional. Because entity theorists believe that traits are stable over time, they are more confident in attributing a person's behavior to their traits.

Research on child development also finds that implicit theories tend to influence flexibility of social judgements. Children who hold entity theories tend to interpret behaviours in a global, rigid manner, commonly making general inferences about a person based on limited information. Further, children generalize negative behaviour more heavily and are less willing to change these judgements when presented new evidence. Alternatively, Children who hold incremental theories show greater flexibility, and more consideration to situational explanations, updating impressions when new information is made available. These patterns fluctuate across different domains as individuals can hold entity beliefs in one area while holding incremental beliefs in another.

== Subconscious Bias ==
Subconscious bias or implicit bias refers to unconscious attitudes or stereotypes that affects an individuals perception of another person. These biases can be based on race, gender identity, sexual orientation, age, and more and can affect a individuals in a wide variety of ways including but not limited to medical care, hiring decisions, and career advancement. Unlike explicit bias, individuals are unaware that their subconscious affects their decision making and can often times contradict what their stated beliefs are.

The implicit-association test (IAT) can be taken to assess the biases an individual has by measuring the strength of associations an individual has between several concepts. The IAT however has been put into scrutiny regarding its reliability and efficacy as it can be difficult to differentiate between stereotyping, the knowledge of the existence of stereotypes, and prejudice. To combat implicit bias, implicit bias training programs have been initiated to limit the effect of implicit biases and help individuals become more aware of them. Current implicit bias training programs may include counterstereotypes, meditation, and negation training however there is very limited knowledge on how to most effectively conduct implicit bias training programs. In some cases, implicit bias training programs have shown to have the opposite effect by reinforcing bias against some individuals and other cases where no change in measured bias occurred after training.

=== Implicit Stereotypes ===
Implicit stereotypes are unconscious beliefs attributed by an individual to another individual based on their affiliation to a social group, often times race and/or gender which fall under the broader category of implicit bias. Implicit stereotypes are built by experiences and learned associations between certain qualities and traits with social groups. Relating to implicit personality theory, implicit stereotypes cause people to make biased inferences on others based on limited amounts of information solely through their past experiences and learned connections from individuals with similar social backgrounds, physical appearances, or affiliations. It is thought that early life experiences, cultural norms, and media programming are origins which shape the implicit stereotypes that an individual has. Often times, individuals may be unaware that they have these stereotypes in their subconscious. A study on impression formation found that there is a common overlap between implicit personality theories and group stereotypes. The research suggests that these operate together, rather than separately. When an observer forms impressions of someone belonging to a salient social group, stereotype-linked traits are consistently applied additionally to the traits directly associated with the person's behaviour. In experiments, participants often assigned stereotypical traits towards individuals even when conflicting with the given descriptions. These results suggest stereotypes can override typical trait association rules under implicit personality theory, forming additive impressions which include both stereotype information as well as individual traits to shape final judgements. These stereotypes can result in both positive and negative beliefs and attributions to other individuals.

== Factors affecting implicit personality theories ==
=== Central vs. peripheral traits ===
When forming an impression, an observer does not weigh every observed trait equally. There are some traits that the observer will consider more than others when forming his ultimate impression. This concept was a main focus of Asch's research on impression formation. Asch termed the highly influential traits which have a strong effect on overall impression as central traits, and the less influential traits which produced smaller effects on overall impression he called peripheral traits. According to Asch, the defining feature of a central trait is that it plays a significant role in determining the content and function of other traits. In the very first study he performed, Asch found that participants asked to form an impression of a person who was "intelligent, skillful, industrious, warm, determined, practical, and cautious" formed significantly different impressions than participants asked to describe a person who was "intelligent, skillful, industrious, cold, determined, practical, and cautious". Furthermore, when these participants were asked to rate which traits on the list were the most important to the formation of their impression, most reported that "warm" (or "cold") was one of the most influential traits on the list. Asch then performed the same experiment using "polite" and "blunt" in place of "warm" and "cold" and found that a change in these two traits had a much weaker effect on the overall impression than changing from "warm" to "cold". Additionally, when a negative central trait such as "cold" is inserted in a list of positive peripheral traits, it has a greater overall effect on the impression than a positive central trait such as "warm" does when it is inserted into a list of negative peripheral traits. More recent research suggests trait centrality could also interact with social category information. When a person is a member of a group with a strongly associated stereotype, observers will often apply stereotype related traits even when they do not match the individual’s characteristics. In these cases, the stereotype functions as an alternate schema shaping which traits are perceived as central, allowing stereotype traits to have larger impacts on perception than trait interaction patterns initially observed by Asch.

=== Effect of observer traits ===
In general, the more an observer believes he exhibits a trait, the more likely the observer is to notice that same trait in other people. In addition, a study by Benedetti & Joseph (1960) showed that some specific observer traits could be significant factors in the impressions that the observer forms of another person. However, this effect is highly variable across various traits and contexts. For example, as compared to outgoing people, those who are more reserved tend to form more positive impressions of other reserved people. However, this pattern was not found when the outgoing people were being judged. In this case, about the same number of outgoing and reserved people attributed other positive traits to the outgoing person. A possible explanation for the observer's tendency to form more positive impressions of people who are similar to him involves the theory of intergroup bias. The idea of intergroup bias suggests that people tend to judge members of their own group more favorably than nonmembers. Under this assumption, reserved people would consider other unsociable people to be in their own group, and would rate them more favorably than people in the outgoing group would.

=== Self-Based Heuristic ===
The self-based heuristic describes the strategy that observers use when they are provided limited trait information about another person, in which case they proceed to "fill in the gaps" with trait information that reflects their own personality. This "filling in" occurs because trait information about the observer's personality is the most easily accessible information the observer's disposal. A common explanation for limited availability of trait information is that some traits are more difficult to judge than others. For example, a trait like extraversion is easy for another person to observe, and is therefore easier to judge in another person than a trait like general affect is. Therefore, when a trait has few external indicators, an observer is more likely to assume another person embodies that trait in a similar way as the observer does. The self-based heuristic is negatively correlated with agreement. In other words, the more an observer uses the self-based heuristic, the less likely it is that he or she is making a correct trait judgment.

=== Primacy effect ===
The primacy effect describes the tendency to weigh information learned first more heavily than information learned later. In terms of impression formation, the primacy effect indicates that the order in which a person's traits are presented affects the overall impression formed about that person. This effect prevails both when forming impressions of a hypothetical person and when asked to form an impression of a target person with whom the observer has actually interacted. Asch hypothesized that the reason for the primacy effect in impression formation is that the first traits learned produce the general direction in which an impression will be formed. After that, all subsequent traits are interpreted in a way that coincides with this established trend. The primacy effect can also be explained in terms of memory. As the short-term memory becomes more and more crowded with trait information, less attention can be given to newer details. Consequently, information learned early on has a greater influence on impression formation because it receives more attention and is remembered more clearly than later information.

=== Mood ===
Mood can play an influential role in impression formation by affecting the way the primacy effect is used when making judgments. Being in a positive mood causes a person to process information in a holistic, all-inclusive fashion while being in a negative mood encourages more adaptive processing which accounts for each detail individually. Therefore, positive mood tends to increase the influence of early information while negative mood has the opposite effect. There is also evidence of a mood-congruent factor, where people in good moods form positive impressions and people in bad moods form negative impressions. This is most likely due to the selective priming of information associated with the current mood state, which causes mood-congruent biases in impression formation.

=== Additive Impressions ===
The concept of additive impressions refers to the cognitive process of forming overall judgements about a person by combining multiple traits, whether observed or inferred. In the context of implicit stereotypes, additive impressions explain how people unconsciously layer assumed traits based on limited cues. For example, if someone is perceived as unfriendly and disorganized, those traits may accumulate to form a more negative overall impression than either trait alone. This mechanism helps explain why stereotyped perceptions are often exaggerated or resistant to change, as multiple trait assumptions can reinforce one another even without supporting evidence.

=== Cognitive Complexity ===
Cognitive complexity refers to an individual's ability to perceive people and situations in nuanced, differentiated ways. Individuals with high cognitive complexity tent to evaluate others using multipole dimensions and are more open to conflicting or ambiguous information. In contrast, people with lower cognitive complexity are more likely to rely on simplified judgements, including stereotypical thinking. Research has shown that lower complexity is associated with greater use of social categories and less attention to individuating information, making implicit stereotypes more likely to influence perception

== Applications in Organizational Settings ==
=== Workplace Perceptions in Male-Dominated Industries ===
A 2019 peer-reviewed study by Shaikh et al. examined the role of implicit personality assumptions and cognitive biases in the construction industry, a sector often characterized by gender imbalance and hierarchical team structures. The researchers found that individuals frequently relied on implicit personality theories when evaluating coworkers—making automatic assumptions about traits such as competence or leadership ability based on limited information or perceived group membership. These assumptions contributed to biased judgments, particularly around gender roles and authority, influencing how workers were perceived and assigned responsibilities.

The findings highlight how implicit personality theory operates beyond academic settings and can influence real-world outcomes, such as workplace dynamics and decision-making. The study underscores the tendency for individuals to form trait-based impressions that reinforce stereotypes—especially under conditions of uncertainty or limited interpersonal familiarity. This research contributes to a growing body of evidence that implicit cognitive frameworks not only shape personal judgements but also affect organizational fairness and role distribution.

=== Implicit Bias in Hiring Decisions ===
Implicit personality theory also plays a role in employment practices, particularly in hiring decisions. A field experiment conducted by Bertrand and Mullainathan (2004) investigated racial bias in the labor market by submitting fictitious resumes with identical qualifications but different names. The researchers found that applicants with names perceived as White (e.g., Emily or David) received approximately 50% more callbacks than those with names perceived as African American (e.g., Aaliyah or Jamar). These findings suggest that implicit associations tied to names can trigger biased trait inferences, such as assumptions about competence or professionalism, which influence hiring decisions. The study highlights how implicit stereotypes can affect social perception even in structured settings.

== Potential drawbacks of implicit personality theories ==
Although there are many advantages to using implicit personality theories when forming impressions, there is some danger in relying too heavily on these theories. In addition to the aforementioned self-based heuristic, another one of the most common misuses of implicit personality theory is when observers believe two traits are more highly correlated than they are in reality. This fallacy can take two forms: the halo effect and logical error. The halo effect describes the tendency of an observer to form a generally favorable, unfavorable, or average impression of a specific person, and to allow that general impression to have an exaggerated effect on their judgments of that person along other trait dimensions. A very common example of the halo effect is when an observer considers attractiveness a favorable trait, and then assumes that a very attractive person whom he meets is also extremely friendly or helpful, because these traits are also favorable. Even though physical attractiveness was measured to be unrelated to intellectual competence in adults, physically attractive individuals were found to be perceived as more intellectually competent compared to less physically attractive peers. On the other hand, a logical error fallacy is made when observers make judgments about trait relationships based on correlations they believe make sense logically, instead of forming these connections based on observations of real-life trait relationships. An example of making the logical error would be assuming that a person who is physically strong and muscular is also athletic. This trait relationship makes logical sense, but without observations to back it up, assuming this relationship would be making the logical error. While both the halo effect and the logical error fallacy result in unfounded trait correlations, the difference is that the halo effect refers to trait correlations of a specific person, while the logical error is more generalizable across the population, and refers to trait correlations that are made with no regard to specific individuals' behaviors.
