= Walter Griffin =

Walter Griffin may refer to:

- Walter Griffin (painter) (1861–1935), American painter
- Walter Burley Griffin (1876–1937), American architect and landscape architect
- Walter L. Griffin (1889–1954), founder of the American Society of Cinematographers
- Walter Griffin (poet) (born 1937), American poet
