= Impression formation =

Concept in social psychology

Impression formation in social psychology refers to the processes by which different pieces of knowledge about another are combined into a global or summary impression. Social psychologist Solomon Asch is credited with the seminal research on impression formation and conducted research on how individuals integrate information about personality traits. Two major models have been proposed to explain how this process of integration takes place. The configural model suggests that people form cohesive impressions by integrating traits into a unified whole, adjusting individual traits to fit an overall context rather than evaluating each trait independently. According to this model, some traits are more schematic and serve as central traits to shape the overall impression. As an individual seeks to form a coherent and meaningful impression of another individual, previous impressions significantly influence the interpretation of subsequent information. In contrast, the algebraic model takes a more additive approach, forming impressions by separately evaluating each trait and then combining these evaluations into an overall summary. A related area to impression formation is the study of person perception, making causal attributions, and then adjusting those inferences based on the information available.

== Methods of study ==
Impression formation has traditionally been studied using three methods pioneered by Asch: free response, free association, and a check-list form. In addition, a fourth method based on a Likert scale with anchors such as "very favorable" and "very unfavorable", has also been used in recent research. A combination of some or all of these techniques is often employed to produce the most accurate assessment of impression formation. Beyond accuracy, the thin slices experiment examined the correlation between first impressions based on brief behavior exposures and more sustained judgments.

=== Free response ===
Free response is an experimental method frequently used in impression formation research. The participant (or perceiver) is presented with a stimulus (usually a short vignette or a list of personality descriptors such as assured, talkative, cold, etc.) and then instructed to briefly sketch his or her impressions of the type of person described. This is a useful technique for gathering detailed and concrete evidence on the nature of the impression formed. However, the difficulty of accurately coding responses often necessitates the use of additional quantitative measures.

=== Free association ===
Free association is another commonly used experimental method in which the perceiver creates a list of personality adjectives that immediately come to mind when asked to think about the type of person described by a particular set of descriptor adjectives.

=== Check-list ===
A check-list consisting of assorted personality descriptors is often used to supplement free response or free association data and to compare group trends. After presenting character-qualities of an imagined individual, perceivers are instructed to select the character adjectives from a preset list that best describe the resulting impression. While this produces an easily quantifiable assessment of an impression, it forces participants' answers into a limited, and often extreme, response set. However, when used in conjunction with the above-mentioned techniques, check-list data provides useful information about the character of impressions.

=== Likert-type rating scales ===
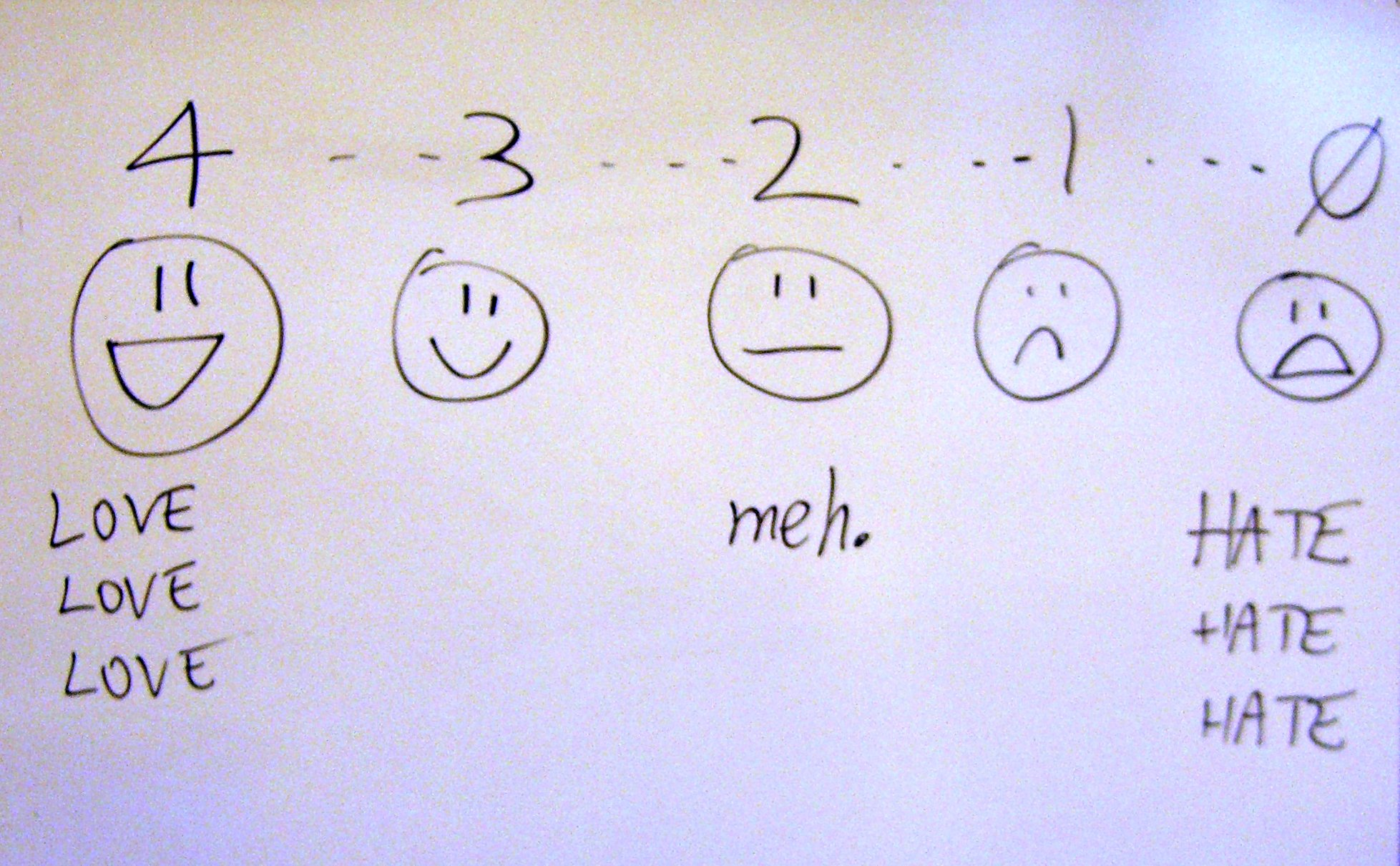
Likert-type rating scale

With Likert scales, perceivers are responding to a presentation of discrete personality characteristics. Common presentation methods include lists of adjectives, photos or videos depicting a scene, or written scenarios. For example, a participant might be asked to answer the question "Would an honest (trait) person ever search for the owner of a lost package (behavior)?" by answering on a 5-point scale ranging from 1 "very unlikely" to 5 "very likely."

=== Thin slices experiments ===
In the thin slices experiment, participants are asked to watch brief video clips depicting the target's behaviors, each lasting a few seconds. They need to then rate the target on various dimensions and provide an overall rating based on the impression from the clips.

== Specific results ==
=== Primacy-recency effect ===
Asch stressed the important influence of an individual's initial impressions of a person's personality traits on the interpretation of all subsequent impressions. Asch argued that these early impressions often shaped or colored an individual's perception of other trait-related details. A considerable body of research exists supporting this hypothesis. For example, when individuals were asked to rate their impression of another person after being presented a list of words progressing from either low favorability to high favorability (L - H) or from high favorability to low favorability (H - L), strong primacy effects were found. In other words, impressions formed from initial descriptor adjectives persisted over time and influenced global impressions. In general, primacy can have three main effects: initial trait-information can be integrated into an individual's global impression of a person in a process of assimilation effects, it can lead to a durable impression against which other information is compared in a process of anchoring, and it can cause people to actively change their perception of others in a process of correction.

=== Valence ===
Information inconsistent with a person's global impression of another individual is especially prominent in memory. The process of assimilation can lead to causal attributions of personality as this inconsistent information is integrated into the whole. This effect is especially influential when the behavior is perceived as negative. Consistent with negativity bias, negative behaviors are seen as more indicative of an individual's behavior in situations involving moral issues. Extreme negative behavior is also considered more predictive of personality traits than less extreme behavior. Additionally, negative stimuli, such as angry faces, are detected quicker, compared to non angry faces, in crowds and are deemed more salient. However, this reasoning can be flawed, as it can trigger a halo effect, where the influence of a single trait is overestimated, overshadowing other factors.

=== Central Traits ===
The emotionality of certain personality traits can influence how subsequent traits are interpreted and ultimately the type of impression formed. For example, when participants are presented with the same list of personality traits, the impression they form can vary notably depending on whether a "warm" trait, as opposed to a "cold" trait is included. People are more likely to perceive an intelligent and warm individual as wise, whereas one described as intelligent and cold tends to be seen as calculating. These traits, which have a disproportionate influence on overall impressions, are referred to as central traits.

=== Nonverbal Behaviors ===
Nonverbal behaviors exert a substantial amount of influence on impression formation. Nonverbal cues were used as the groundwork when participants were forming impressions of a speaker It was also seen that inconsistency between verbal and nonverbal cues prompted participants to rate the speaker to be less sincere, which further evidences the role of nonverbal behaviors in impression formation. The influence of nonverbal behaviors is also seen in professional settings such as the police force. Detectives with years of experience in their fields showed low accuracy rates when presented with the ask of identifying deception.

== History ==
=== Classic experiments ===
In a classic experiment, Solomon Asch's principal theoretical concern revolved around understanding the mechanisms influencing a person's overall impression of others, principally trait centrality and trait valence of various personality characteristics. His research illustrated the influential roles of the primacy effect, valence, and causal attribution on the part of the individual. Based on the findings of ten experiments studying the effect of various personality adjectives on the resulting quality and character of impressions, several key principles of impression formation have been identified:

1. Individuals have a natural inclination to make global dispositional inferences about the nature of another person's personality.
2. Individuals expect observed behaviors to reflect stable personality traits.
3. Individuals attempt to fit information about different traits and behaviors into a meaningful and coherent whole.
4. Individuals attempt to explain and rationalize inconsistencies when the available information does not fit with the global perception.

=== Theoretical development ===
In psychology Fritz Heider's writings on balance theory emphasized that liking or disliking a person depends on how the person is positively or negatively linked to other liked or disliked entities. Heider's later essay on social cognition, along with the development of "psycho-logic" by Robert P. Abelson and Milton J. Rosenberg, embedded evaluative processes in verbal descriptions of actions, with the verb of a descriptive sentence establishing the kind of linkage existing between the actor and object of the sentence.

Dwek and fellow researchers built on Heider's work in combination with Kelly Lowell's work, where he emphasized the stability of personality, which could be shaped through life events. They proposed the presence of individual differences among implicit beliefs about human attributes, which influence their assumptions and judgements of behaviors. The implicit theories they suggested were the entity and incremental mindsets. Entity theorists viewed dispositional traits as fixed and were more likely to attribute behaviors to dispositional factors, neglecting situational contexts. On the other hand, incremental theorists believed that personal characteristics were malleable and are more inclined to consider the context when assessing behaviors

Harry Gollob expanded Heider's insights with his subject-verb-object approach to social cognition, and he showed that evaluations of sentence subjects could be calculated with high precision from out-of-context evaluations of the subject, verb, and object, with part of the evaluative outcome coming from multiplicative interactions among the input evaluations. In a later work, Gollob and Betty Rossman extended the framework to predicting an actor's power and influence. Reid Hastie wrote that "Gollob's extension of the balance model to inferences concerning subject-verb-object sentences is the most important methodological and theoretical development of Heider's principle since its original statement."

Gollob's regression equations for predicting impressions of sentence subjects consisted of weighted summations of out-of-context ratings of the subject, verb, and object, and of multiplicative interactions of the ratings. The equations essentially supported the cognitive algebra approach of Norman H. Anderson's Information integration theory. Anderson, however, initiated a heated technical exchange between himself and Gollob, in which Anderson argued that Gollob's use of the general linear model led to indeterminate theory because it could not completely account for any particular case in the set of cases used to estimate the models. The recondite exchange typified a continuing debate between proponents of contextualism who argue that impressions result from situationally specific influences (e.g., from semantics and nonverbal communication as well as affective factors), and modelers who follow the pragmatic maxim, seeking approximations revealing core mental processes. Another issue in using least-squares estimations is the compounding of measurement error problems with multiplicative variables.

In sociology David R. Heise relabeled Gollob's framework from subject-verb-object to actor-behavior-object in order to allow for impression formation from perceived events as well as from verbal stimuli, and showed that actions produce impressions of behaviors and objects as well as of actors on all three dimensions of Charles E. Osgood's semantic differential—Evaluation, Potency, and Activity. Heise used equations describing impression-formation processes as the empirical basis for his cybernetic theory of action, Affect control theory.

Erving Goffman's book The Presentation of Self in Everyday Life and his essay "On Face-work" in the book Interaction Ritual focused on how individuals engage in impression management. Using the notion of face as identity is used now, Goffman proposed that individuals maintain face expressively. "By entering a situation in which he is given a face to maintain, a person takes on the responsibility of standing guard over the flow of events as they pass before him. He must ensure that a particular expressive order is sustained-an order that regulates the flow of events, large or small, so that anything that appears to be expressed by them will be consistent with his face." In other words, individuals control events so as to create desired impressions of themselves. Goffman emphasized that individuals in a group operate as a team with everyone committed to helping others maintain their identities.

== Impression formation in children and adolescents ==
Developmental psychologists have found that the ability to form impressions begins in early childhood and becomes more advancedly honed throughout adolescence. Preschool-aged children tend to rely more on observable behaviors and simple evaluative judgments (e.g., "nice" or "mean") to form impressions. These judgments are often binary and based on direct experience or short-term observation. For example, a child may label another as "bad" simply because they witnessed them taking a toy, without considering the broader context.

On top of this, even children as young as age 3 begin developing face-based trust impressions. Preschoolers were shown to have high sensitivity towards facial cues that are associated with trustworthiness, such as positive or negative facial expressions. These processes are argued to be an evolutionary trait that allows the children to identify threats, but also identify those that can help. However, over time, face-based trust impressions tend to develop based on social experience and cognitive development.

As children grow older, particularly around the middle of their childhood, they begin to understand the concept that people have enduring internal traits and motives that can explain behavior. This trait-based reasoning allows for more complex impressions to be formed and builds the ability to infer personality characteristics over time. Cognitive advancements during this stage enable children to integrate past experiences, third-party observations, and contextual clues into their social judgments.

During adolescence, impression formation becomes more nuanced due to continued development in social cognition and increased exposure to diverse social environments. Adolescents are more likely to consider moral intent, social group membership, and emotional expressions when forming impressions of others. They also become highly attuned and aware to how others form impressions of them, leading to greater self-monitoring, impression management, and sometimes social anxiety.

== Stereotypes in impression-formation ==
Stereotypes influence the formation of impressions across cultures and different demographic groups. The valence of the impressions formed depends on the valence of the stereotypes activated in the perceiver. Some results also implied that the mere accessibility of stereotypes was the primary determinant of the impression formed, regardless of whether or not the observer explicitly affirmed them. The different types of stereotypes influencing the impression formation depends on the context, the racial demographic of the actor and the gender, with women being subjected to more positive impressions when rater by people who strongly endorse traditional female stereotypes.

== Impression-formation processes in the US ==
Ratings of 515 action descriptions by American respondents yielded estimations of a statistical model consisting of nine impression-formation equations, predicting outcome Evaluation, Potency, and Activity of actor, behavior, and object from pre-event ratings of the evaluation, potency, and activity of actor, behavior, and object. The results were reported as maximum-likelihood estimations.

Stability was a factor in every equation, with some pre-action feeling toward an action element transferred to post-action feeling about the same element. Evaluation, Potency, and Activity of behaviors suffused to actors so impressions of actors were determined in part by the behaviors they performed. In general objects of action lost Potency.

Interactions among variables included consistency effects, such as receiving Evaluative credit for performing a bad behavior toward a bad object person, and congruency effects, such as receiving evaluative credit for nice behaviors toward weak objects or bad behaviors toward powerful objects. Third-order interactions included a balance effect in which actors received a boost in evaluation if two or none of the elements in the action were negative, otherwise a decrement. Across all nine prediction equations, more than half of the 64 possible predictors (first-order variables plus second- and third-order interactions) contributed to outcomes. (Note: Impression-formation effects are described in detail by Heise in Expressive Order, Chapter 6. Ordinary least squares estimations of equations from the 515-event study, and from studies mentioned in this article, can be examined in Interact On-Line (Java applet))

Studies of event descriptions that explicitly specified behavior settings found that impression-formation processes are largely the same when settings are salient, but the setting becomes an additional contributor to impression formation regarding actor, behavior, and object; and the action changes the impression of the setting.

Actor and object are the same person in self-directed actions such as "the lawyer praised himself" or various kinds of self-harm. Impression-formation research indicates that self-directed actions reduce the positivity of actors on the Evaluation, Potency, and Activity dimensions. Self-directed actions therefore are not an optimal way to confirm the good, potent, lively identities that people normally want to maintain. Rather self-directed actions are a likely mode of expression for individuals who want to manifest their low self-esteem and self-efficacy.

Early work on impression formation used action sentences like, "The kind man praises communists," and "Bill helped the corrupt senator," assuming that modifier-noun combinations amalgamate into a functional unit. A later study found that a modifier-noun combination does form an overall impression that works in action descriptions like a noun alone. The action sentences in that study combined identities with status characteristics, traits, moods, and emotions. Another study in 1989 focused specifically on emotion descriptors combined with identities (e.g., an angry child) and again found that emotion terms amalgamate with identities, and equations describing this kind of amalgamation are of the same form as equations describing trait-identity amalgamation.

== Cross-cultural studies ==
Studies of various kinds of impression formation have been conducted in Canada, Japan, and Germany. Core processes are similar cross-culturally. For example, in every culture that has been studied, Evaluation of an actor was determined by-among other things-a stability effect, a suffusion from the behavior Evaluation, and an interaction that rewarded an actor for performing a behavior whose Evaluation was consistent with the Evaluation of the object person.

On the other hand, each culture weighted the core effects distinctively. For example, the impact of behavior-object Evaluation consistency was much smaller in Germany than in the United States, Canada, or Japan, suggesting that moral judgments of actors have a somewhat different basis in Germany than in the other cultures. Additionally, impression-formation processes involved some unique interactions in each culture. For example, attribute-identity amalgamations in Germany involved some Potency and Activity interactions that did not appear in other cultures.

The 2010 book Surveying Cultures reviewed cross-cultural research on impression-formation processes, and provided guidelines for conducting impression-formation studies in cultures where the processes are unexplored currently.

== Impression formation in digital contexts ==
Impression formation in computer-mediated environments (CMEs) differs significantly from face-to-face interactions. This is due to multiple factors which include the absence of real-time, nonverbal cues such as facial expressions, tone of voice, and body language. In CMEs, individuals rely heavily on verbal content, profile pictures, usernames, and posting behavior to construct impressions of others. As a result, online environments often amplify selective self-presentation, allowing users to curate idealized versions of themselves.

According to Walther's hyperpersonal model of communication, online interactions can actually lead to stronger, more positive impressions than face-to-face interactions because of asynchronicity, greater message control, and the ability to edit responses carefully. For example, users may spend more time crafting messages or choosing images that convey desirable traits, which can distort the authenticity of first impressions.

Studies on online dating platforms and social media show that details that may seem minor—such as the angle of a profile photo, the use of emojis, spelling and grammar, or the presence of mutual friends—can significantly shape how others evaluate a person's personality, intelligence, and social status. However, these impressions are known to change quickly once more contextual or behavioral information becomes available.

Algorithmic environments now play a role in shaping first impressions by selectively presenting certain content or people. This creates a feedback loop in which curated impressions can be reinforced or distorted by machine learning-based personalization. As technology becomes increasingly embedded in social interaction, digital impression formation continues to evolve in complexity and influence.

== Evolutionary psychology perspective ==
From an evolutionary psychology perspective, impression formation is viewed as an adaptive process that enhances survival and reproductive success. Early humans needed to make rapid judgments about others in order to avoid threats, identify allies, and select mates. As such, the human brain evolved mechanisms to quickly assess key traits, particularly trustworthiness, dominance, health, and emotional stability, often from subtle cues like facial structure, body language, and voice tone.

This perspective suggests that certain first impressions are hardwired. For example, symmetrical faces are often rated as more attractive, which may be due to associations with genetic fitness. Similarly, people with deep voices or strong jawlines are often perceived as more dominant, reflecting ancestral cues to strength or leadership potential. These snap judgments often occur unconsciously and can be resistant to change, even in the face of contradictory information.

== Recent studies ==
Impression formation is based on the characteristics of both the perceivers and targets. However, research has not been able to quantify the extent to which these two groups contribute to impression. The research was conducted to determine the extent of how impressions originate from 'our mind' and 'target face'. Results demonstrated that perceiver characteristics contribute more than target appearance. Impressions can be made from facial appearance alone and assessments on attributes such as nice, strong, and smart based on variations of the targets' face. The results show that subtle facial traits have meaningful consequences on impressions, which is true even for young children of 3 years old. Studies have been conducted to study impression formation in social situations rather than situations involving threat. Research reveals that social goals can drive the formation of impressions and that there is flexibility in the possible impressions formed on target faces.

== Neuroscience of impression formation ==
Research in social neuroscience has highlighted the neural mechanisms involved in impression formation during the evaluation of social and personality traits. One of the key brain regions implicated is the medial prefrontal cortex (mPFC), which is consistently activated when individuals evaluate others' traits, intentions, and social status. The mPFC is involved in what psychologists call mentalizing—the ability to understand and predict the thoughts and feelings of others—which is central to forming impressions based on minimal social information.

The amygdala also plays a significant role in rapid assessments of emotional and social stimuli, especially when judgments involve trustworthiness, fear, or threat detection. The amygdala's involvement suggests that impression formation often occurs automatically and is shaped by emotional salience. For example, individuals often form impressions about facial trustworthiness within milliseconds, a process that has been shown to activate the amygdala even without conscious awareness.

Other brain regions also contribute to the process. The superior temporal sulcus (STS) is important for interpreting dynamic social cues such as facial expressions, eye gaze, and body language. The hippocampus aids in retrieving past social experiences, which can influence current judgments about others. Additionally, the temporoparietal junction (TPJ) and posterior cingulate cortex are involved in perspective-taking, memory integration, and moral reasoning during impression formation.

Together, these regions form a distributed network that supports both automatic, emotion-based impressions and deliberate, reflective evaluations. Impression formation is not a single, isolated process, but rather a dynamic system that draws upon emotional, cognitive, and contextual information.

== Temporal dynamics of impression formation ==
While first impressions are often made within seconds, research shows that impressions can evolve over time as more information becomes available. The concept of thin slices refers to the ability to form surprisingly accurate judgments based on very brief observations of behavior—sometimes lasting only a few seconds. These initial judgments are often stable, but not always accurate, especially when influenced by biases or limited context.

The primacy effect and recency effect shape how the order of information presentation influences impression formation. The primacy effect occurs when information presented early carries more weight, while the recency effect gives more influence to the most recently acquired data. Studies have shown that people tend to anchor their impressions based on the first traits they encounter and adjust less than might be rational as new information is presented.

Under certain conditions, people do revise their impressions, especially when confronted with strongly disconfirming evidence. This revision process depends on factors such as motivation, need for accuracy, and whether the perceiver holds pre-existing stereotypes. However, once an impression is formed, people tend to engage in confirmation bias, seeking out or remembering information that supports their original evaluation.

== See also ==
- First impression (psychology)
