= Transient state =

State of a system after conditions are changed, before it settles into steady state

In systems theory, a system is said to be transient or in a transient state when a process variable or variables have been changed and the system has not yet reached a steady state. In electrical engineering, the time taken for an electronic circuit to change from one steady state to another steady state is called the transient time.

== Examples ==
=== Chemical Engineering ===
When a chemical reactor is being brought into operation, the concentrations, temperatures, species compositions, and reaction rates are changing with time until operation reaches its nominal process variables.

=== Electrical engineering ===
When a switch is closed in an electrical circuit containing a capacitor or inductor, the component draws out the resulting change in voltage or current, causing the system to take a substantial amount of time to reach a new steady state. This period of time is known as the transient state.

A capacitor acts as a short circuit immediately after the switch is closed, increasing its impedance during the transient state until it acts as an open circuit in its steady state.

An inductor is the opposite, behaving as an open circuit until reaching a short circuit steady state.

=== Statistics and Stochastic Processes ===
In the classification of states of a stochastic process, a state is transient if after leaving it, there is a positive probability of never returning to that state. Otherwise the state is called recurrent.

== See also ==
- Attractor
- Carrying capacity
- Control theory
- Dynamical system
- Ecological footprint
- Economic growth
- Engine test stand
- Equilibrium point
- List of types of equilibrium
- Evolutionary economics
- Growth curve
- Herman Daly
- Homeostasis
- Lead-lag compensator
- Limit cycle
- Limits to Growth
- Population dynamics
- Race condition
- Simulation
- State function
- Steady state
- Steady state economy
- Steady State theory
- Systems theory
- Thermodynamic equilibrium
- Transient modelling
- Transient response
