= Seasonal Attribution Project =

BOINC based volunteer computing climate'prediction.net subproject

The Seasonal Attribution Project is a climate'prediction.net sub-project, with support from the WWF. It runs a high resolution model in order to try to determine the extent to which extreme weather events are attributable to human-induced global warming.

The project did cease giving out more work, however there has been a project extension to try a fourth sea surface temperature pattern. Current work will still be accepted and used for collaborations and possibly revisions of papers during the review process.

A further extension will start soon.

== The experiments ==
- United Kingdom floods of Autumn 2000 – Current project.
- Mountain snowpack decline in western North America Developed in collaboration with the Climate Impacts Group at the University of Washington.
- Heatwave occurrence in South Africa and India

The latter two will use the same models. Information has been uploaded but analysis of information generated has not yet started.

== See also ==
- Effects of global warming
