= Walter Griffin (poet) =

American poet (1937–2020)

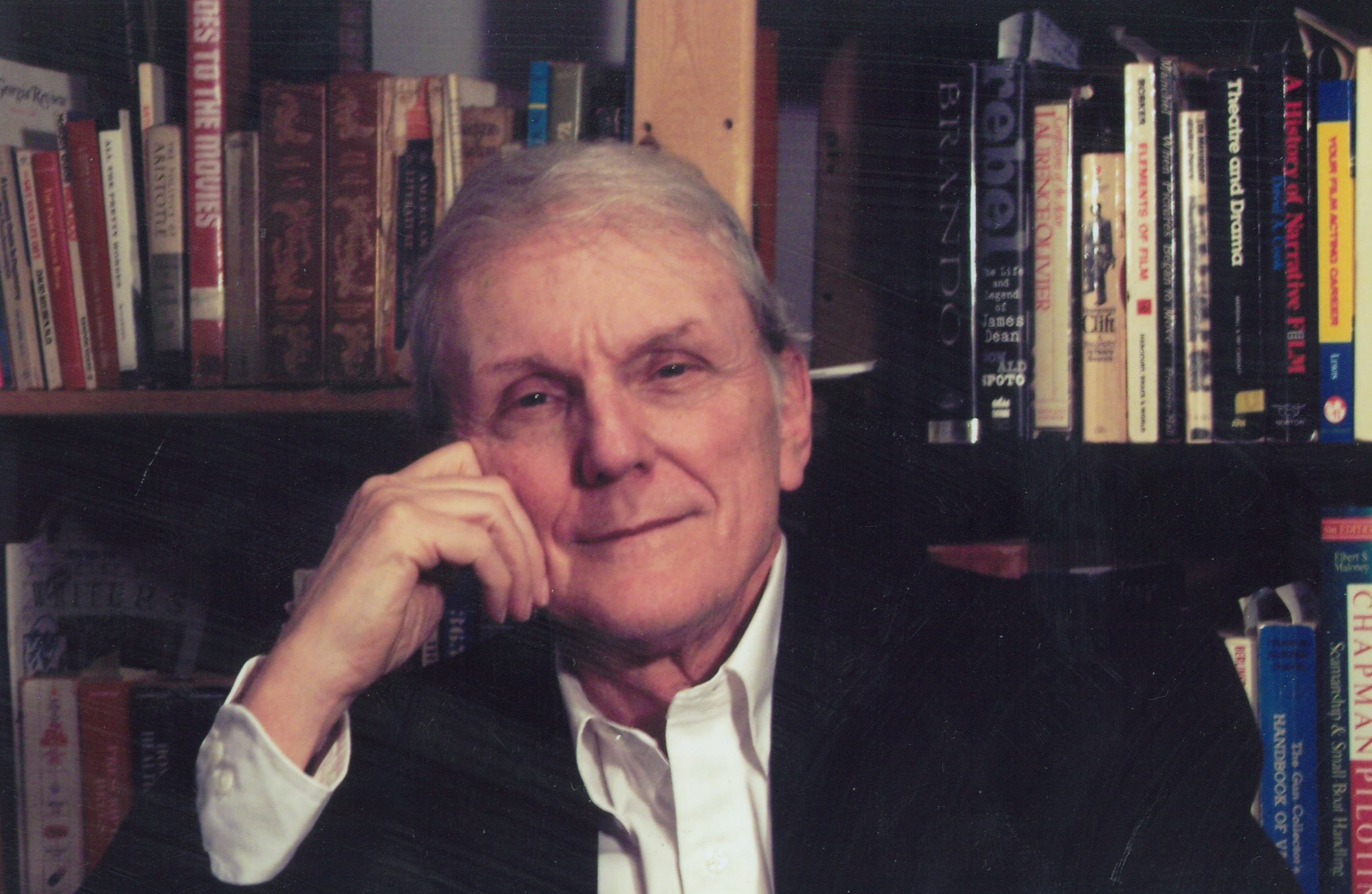
- Walter Griffin
- Born: Jasper Walter Griffin; August 1, 1937; Wilmington, Delaware, U.S.
- Died: August 1, 2020 (aged 83)

Walter Griffin (August 1, 1937 – November 30, 2020) was an American poet. He was the author of ten poetry collections, and his work has appeared in over 400 national and international publications. These include Harper's, The Paris Review, Poetry, The Atlantic, Evergreen Review, The New York Times, Kenyon Review, Sewanee Review, Southern Review, Oxford American, and New England Review. Griffin's poetry frequently portrays transients, outcasts, and wanderers.

== Life ==
Born Jasper Walter Griffin in Wilmington, Delaware, he was the only son of William Samuel Griffin and Nina Opal Blalock. A year after Griffin's birth, his father abandoned the family. Consequently, Griffin experienced an unstable childhood, living with his mother or relatives in various locations, including Florida, Georgia, South Carolina, and Europe. He attended Gordon Military School (now Gordon State College) in Barnesville, Georgia from 1951 to 1954.

By 1955, while living in France, Griffin was facing the French military draft. He avoided conscription by enlisting in the U.S. Army in Germany, serving three years in the infantry. Following his military service, which included time both stateside and in Europe, he hitchhiked from New York to California, seeking what he termed "the essence of the core of reality".

He supported himself with various jobs, working as a bellhop on Nantucket Island, a carnival barker in Florida, and a boiler room manager for construction companies in Ohio and Atlanta. It was during this nomadic period that he began to seriously pursue writing. A pivotal moment occurred in 1959 when Griffin was attending classes unofficially at Ohio State University in Columbus. Seeking refuge from the cold, he entered a bookstore, picked up a copy of The Paris Review, and was "stunned" by Lewis Simpson's poem, "The Boarder."

"It was so poignant and complete, and described my life at that point," Griffin recalled. "It made me want to get better as a poet, and for any reader that I might ever have, to get the same feeling as I did for Simpson's poem."

Griffin eventually ceased traveling, settled in the Atlanta suburbs, married, and had a son (Paul Anthony Griffin), though the marriage ended in divorce a little over a year later.

After several of his poems were featured in Harper's in 1972, Griffin's work began appearing regularly in major literary journals. His collection Night Music (1974) secured both the International Small Press Book Award and the Georgia Poet of the Year Award from the Southeastern Regional Council of Authors and Journalists. Western Flyers (1990) was a co-winner of the University of West Florida's Panhandler Chapbook Series competition.

Following a period as an adjunct instructor in poetry for Emory University's Evening Classes program, Griffin founded and directed the Atlanta Poets Workshop for 27 years. Although Griffin's success as a poet developed largely outside of academic institutions, he spent 11 years teaching in poetry-in-the-schools programs, visiting over 110 schools, colleges, prisons, and youth detention centers in three states. In 1978, the Georgia Council for the Arts and Humanities named him Master-Poet-in-Residence.

Griffin died on November 30, 2020, at the age of 83.

== Work ==
Griffin composed economical, elegant free verse that portrays marginalized figures: losers, drifters, and outsiders, using sympathetic and musically rich language. In Visiting Day, the voice belongs to a prison inmate who receives "milkshakes and hamburgers" from a female visitor. Similarly, the protagonist of Con Man bolts from his boarding house room for a beer when his female companion reveals her pregnancy. T Fleischmann observes that Griffin "has consistently taken on the perspective of the outsider, the drifter in American culture who watches the rest of society without ever truly becoming a part of it." Long Distance features a solitary speaker, yearning for companionship, who receives a phone call with no one on the other end. The speaker then imagines people in a park who also feel alone even while interacting with one another.

Griffin's poems are filled with the imagery of transients and life on the road: motorcycles, cars, big rigs, buses, hitchhikers, and highways. They depict many one-night stays in boarding houses and cheap hotels, underscored by a hovering sense of violence and death, and permeated by loneliness and a deep longing, especially for the lost past. Several poems address the father he never knew. In Heritage, he writes: "We swim together / where mirrors meet / and even the fish are cold."

Malcolm Glass, the judge who selected Griffin's Western Flyers for the Panhandler Chapbook Series, drew a comparison between Griffin's darker themes and focus on death to the work of Yeats. Glass states that Griffin's darkness "is not depressing" because his "delight in language well-crafted infuses [his poems] with life." Glass also points out that the narrators of Griffin's poems attempt to grasp the past, only to discover it is invariably elusive.

Griffin has described his own work by saying: "In my poems, I attempt to deal with middle America and the isolation, the inherent loneliness of the human spirit. They are about white frame houses passed long ago in the night. And the vagrant stranger who walks by lighted windows at dusk, feeling the traveler in us all."

== Bibliography ==
- Leaving for New York (Nirvana Publications, 1968)
- Other Cities (Hartford Press, 1971)
- Bloodlines (Windless Orchard Press, 1973)
- Ice Garden (Wisconsin Review Press, 1973)
- Night Music (Pale Horse Press, 1974), winner of International Small Press Book Award and Georgia Poet of the Year Award from the Southeastern Regional Council of Authors and Journalists
- Port Authority: Selected Poems, 1965–1976 (Brevity Press, 1975), nominated for the Pulitzer Prize
- Machineworks (Sweetwater Press, 1976), edited by David Bottoms
- Skulldreamer and Other Poems (Border-Mountain Press, 1977)
- Western Flyers (University of West Florida, 1990), co-winner of the Panhandler Chapbook Series contest
- Nights of Noise and Light (Skidrow Penthouse Press, 1999)
