= Social vision =

Subtopic of social psychology

Social vision is a sub-topic of social psychology that investigates the ways from which individuals extract information and perceive others using their vision alone. The field of social vision is highly interdisciplinary and located at the nexus of social psychology, communication studies, and vision science.

Much of the research in social vision is based on the prevailing theory that the visual system is particularly attuned to social cues in the environment. More of the human brain is devoted to vision than all other senses combined, and social vision research seeks to understand how humans are able to use vision to accurately perceive characteristics of other individuals such as age, race, gender, and sexual orientation in a short time frame as well as how individual beliefs may bias the way humans perceive said individuals.

== Historical development ==
Social vision was developed as a research field in the early 2000s. The Science of Social Vision, an amalgamation of social vision research, was released in 2010, followed by a special edition issue of Social Cognition in 2013 that focused on social vision. The field developed at the intersection of social psychology and vision science, borrowing techniques from both fields to investigate social perception.

== Thin-slice vision ==
Thin-slice vision refers to the accuracy with which observers are able to correctly identify imperceptible characteristics of a person after watching the individual alone or acting in a group for only a short amount of time. When examining thin-slice vision, researchers provide anywhere from thirty seconds to five minutes of recorded behavior to an observer who has no relationship with the recorded individual and no knowledge of the context of the recorded behavior. Thin-slice vision research has found that people are generally more accurate with inferences using visual elements of a scene alone rather than recordings that have both visual and auditory elements; therefore, it focuses exclusively on the use of visual stimuli. In addition, observers tend to be just as accurate in correctly guessing information about an individual in short time segments such as fifteen seconds of perception as they are during longer segments such as fifteen minutes. As a result, thin-slice vision research is argued to be its own unique modality of social perception, separate from auditory perception and relying on very short time frames.

=== Individual characteristics ===
Research has consistently demonstrated that thin-slice vision leads to highly accurate perception of individual characteristics. When they were examining personality, observers were able to accurately assess men's extraversion, interpersonal warmth, and sociosexuality levels after they watched a short, silent clip of the men being interviewed. In a different set of studies, observers watched a silent clip of a man entering an empty room, reading a weather report, and then exiting the room; yet they were highly accurate in assessing his masculinity, extraversion, conscientiousness, and neuroticism levels. Additional research has replicated these results while additionally finding that life satisfaction was perceivable in these thin-slices as well. One set of studies conducted in 2003 asked participants to view silenced clips of one minute or less depicting an individual engaging in an informal social interaction and found that observers were able to accurately assess the IQ of the observed person well above a chance. The relative power and status of employees in a company was additionally assessed with high accuracy by observers who were given a one-minute clip of the employees engaging in a puzzle task.

==== Attitudes ====
Perhaps because of the significant social consequences of appearing prejudiced towards racial minorities, objective observers are extremely accurate in assessing racial bias during silenced thin-slice clips. In one study, naïve judges were given twenty-second clips of a white subject interacting with either a white or black confederate, and observers were able to accurately assess racial bias as well as negative effect even when the clip did not include information about the race of the confederate that the subject was interacting with. In another example of attitudes being quickly perceived in thin-slice videos, subjects were given ten-second silent clips of teachers giving a lecture to a classroom. After they watched the clip, observers stated how likely it is that the teacher would treat high-achieving and low-achieving students equally, and their ratings were positively correlated with the teacher's actual biases. Raters who were given thin-slice silent clips of judges in court cases were also above-chance in guessing whether the judge personally believed the defendant was innocent or guilty based on watching said judge give the jury their final instructions at the end of the trial. Judges who believed the defendant would be found guilty were seen as less warm, competent, and wise in the clip while additionally appearing more anxious.

==== Mental health ====
Perceivers are highly reliable in correctly assessing mental health as well. For example, one meta-analysis found that perceivers were able to accurately and reliably estimate how much state- and trait-anxiety individuals possessed when provided clips of the individuals' silent behavior alone. In another study that presented observers with silenced admissions interviews at a psychiatric hospital, both experts and non-experts in mental health were correct in assessing whether patients did or did not suffer with depression 88% of the time on average. In one set of studies researchers found that, while most personality disorders are not guessed accurately by observers in thin-slice exposures, observers were highly accurate in assessing avoidant, histrionic, and obsessive-compulsive personality disorders.

==== Relationships and sexuality ====
Despite the highly personal nature of sexuality, observers are able to reliably estimate the sexuality of strangers with relative ease. A series of studies in 1999 provided observers with silent clips that were either ten-seconds or one-second long in which heterosexual and homosexual subjects discussed their academic and extracurricular activities. Observers were well-above chance in correctly identifying which participants were heterosexual or homosexual and remained correct far above chance even when the videos were digitally degraded so that only the outlines of the individuals were presented. Another study examined perceptions of gait and their relationship to sexuality assessment. The researchers found that men who swayed their hips but did not swagger their shoulders while walking were significantly more likely to be categorized as homosexual by observers, and that over-all the observers who relied upon this information during thin-slice videos were more accurate than their peers in correctly guessing the sexuality of a recorded male walking.

Observers are additionally accurate at assessing the socio-sexuality of individuals in silent thin-slice clips. In one study, observers were given silent thin-slice videos of people engaging in a first-date interview. These observers correctly identified to what degree said interviewees were socio-sexual, even when controlling for the physical attractiveness of the person being interviewed. Another set of studies found that observers were able to reliably judge how likely it was for a man to sexually harass women he encountered by showing the observers a short, silent clip that lasted less than three minutes of him being interviewed by an attractive woman.

Additional research has examined how reliably observers can estimate if individuals are in a romantic relationship. One set of studies provided naïve judges with fifteen-second silent clips of two individuals having a brief discussion side by side. Observers were able to reliably predict if the pair were friends, strangers, or involved romantically. Another set of studies had observers examine silent thin-slice clips where two strangers were asked to plan a trip around the world together. Observers were able to reliably predict how close the two individuals felt by the end of the session. When observers were given access to only transcripts, only auditory, or only visual information from the two strangers planning a trip, individuals that were provided silent thin-slice visual recordings remained the most accurate at judging the rapport of the strangers.

=== Predictiveness ===
Some of the most well-known research conducted in thin-slice vision involves the way thin-slice visual clips allow observers to reliably predict future behavior or efficacy in a variety of situations. These results range from the effectiveness of teachers during instruction to the future performance of health practitioners or likelihood of a crime being committed, all judged from silent clips.

==== Occupational efficacy ====
In a series of studies, silent thin-slice clips were found to be highly predictive of teacher effectiveness. In 1993, college and high school teachers were videotaped while teaching classes, and silent thin-slice videos of these lectures were provided to naïve judges. Observers were highly likely to agree on the perceived efficacy of a teacher or professor based on the thirty-second clips they were shown, and these ratings were strongly correlated with both student evaluations and supervisor evaluations of the teacher's efficacy in teaching the course. Another set of studies provided observers with fifteen-second thin-slice clips of occupational therapy students. Students who were rated poorly in the fifteen-second clips by naïve observers subsequently displayed poor clinical performance as well. An additional study provided observers with one-minute slices of silent behavior where physical therapists interacted with elderly patients. The more the observers rated the practitioners as distant, the less likely patients were able to pursue daily living activities such as bathing or walking after discharge.

==== Behavior ====
Much of the behavior prediction research that has occurred in the thin-slice domain of social vision has been focused on the topic of criminal justice. One set of studies examining jury behavior examined silent thin-slice clips of trial judges reading final instructions to the jury. The more the observers rated the trial judge as dominant, the more likely they were to be accurate in predicting that jury would find the defendant innocent. Another set of studies examined the likelihood of a crime being committed based on a short, silent thin-slice clip. Videos were taken from closed-circuit television cameras; eighteen silent clips that led to a crime were matched with eighteen roughly similar clips that did not lead to a crime, and the beginning of these clips were shown to naïve judges. The observers were extremely reliable in stating which clips were leading to criminal behavior and which clips were not, with later analyses suggesting observers were able to detect future criminal behavior based on the gait and gesture of the individuals caught on film.

== Body motion ==
Research on body motion in social vision focuses on what information perceivers are able to extract when seeing an individual move. This research is primarily conducted by showing subjects point-light displays of human movement. The underlying premise of body motion research is that a large amount of social information is conveyed when a body is in motion, and the human visual system is fine-tuned to detect such social information.

=== Social perception ===
==== Personality characteristics ====
Individuals have been able to correctly identify the identity of themselves and others in point-light displays. They are also able to accurately guess an individual's psychological openness, age, and vulnerability to attack. Emotional state is reliably extracted from point-light displays as well. In one study, observers were provided a point-light display of only an arm knocking on a door yet were still able to reliably assess the emotional state of the individual who performed the knocking. The accuracy of perceiving emotion in point-light displays is additionally amplified when two or more individuals are presented in the display.

==== Gender and sexuality ====
Body motion is highly diagnostic of sex category membership, and observers have proven to reliably identify the gender of a walker in a point-light display. Untrained observers have additionally proven to be adept at assessing another person's reproductive fitness based on light display motion. Overall, people are extremely adept at gender perception in body motion, even proving able to detect when point-light displays are attempting to deceive the observer about what gender a walker may be. In a classic study in 1983, individuals who were being recorded walking for point-light display videos were asked to walk in gender consistent and inconsistent ways. When the videos were played for observers, the subjects were able to easily detect when point-light displays were walking in gender inconsistent ways rather than categorizing the point-light display as the gender the walk was mimicking. Researchers suggest that because men's and women's bodies differ biologically, body motion is also likely to vary accordingly. People have also proven to be highly reliable at detecting an individual's sexual orientation from dynamic motion in point-light displays as well.

=== Detection errors ===
Body motion research in social vision relies on the underlying theory that quickly and reliably perceiving body motion is vital for successful social interactions. However, this leads to the prediction that difficulty in social interaction may be in part due to the inability to read body motion accurately. Research has verified this result using Autism Spectrum Disorder (ASD), showing that individuals with ASD have unique challenges when perceiving body motion as compared to controls. Researchers found that children with ASD showed significant delays in recognizing point-light displays, as moving people and were much less likely to describe the emotional state of people being portrayed in point-light displays, with both results also being replicated among a population with Asperger's Syndrome. These results have been used to argue that body motion is indeed a significant source of information in social behavior.
