= Interpersonal perception =

Interpersonal perception is an area of research in social psychology which examines the beliefs that interacting people have about each other. This area differs from social cognition and person perception by being interpersonal rather than intrapersonal, and thus requiring the interaction of at least two actual people. There are three stages of the perception process including selection, organization, and interpretation.

== Phenomena studied ==
- accuracy – the correctness of A's beliefs about B
- self-other agreement – whether A's beliefs about B matches B's beliefs about themself
- similarity – whether A's and B's beliefs match
- projection/assumed similarity – whether A's beliefs about B match A's beliefs about themself
- reciprocity – the similarity of A's and B's beliefs about each other
- meta-accuracy – whether A knows how others see them
- assumed projection – whether A thinks others see them as they see them

These variables cannot be assessed in studies that ask people to form beliefs about fictitious targets.

== Research ==
Although interest in this area has grown rapidly with the publication of Canadian journalist Malcolm Gladwell's 2005 book Blink and Nalini Ambady's "thin-slices" research, the discipline is still very young, having only been formally defined by David Kenny in 1994. The sparsity of research, in particular on the accuracy of first-impressions, means that social psychologists know a lot about what people think about others, but far less about whether they are right.

Many attribute this to a criticism that Lee Cronbach wrote in 1955 about how impression accuracy was calculated, which resulted in a 30-year hiatus in research. During that time, psychologists focused on consensus (whether A and B agree in their beliefs about C) rather than accuracy, although Kenny has argued that consensus is neither necessary nor sufficient for accuracy.

Today, the use of correlations instead of discrepancy scores to measure accuracy and the development of the Big Five model of personality have overcome Cronbach's criticisms and led to a wave of new research . People more accurately perceive extraversion and conscientiousness in strangers than they do the other personality domains. A 5-second interaction tells you as much as 15 minutes on these domains, and video tells you more than audio alone.

Viewing peoples' personal websites or "online profiles" (as on MySpace, Facebook, or a dating website) can make people as knowledgeable about their conscientiousness and open-mindedness as their long-term friends. The question of whether social-networking sites lead to accurate first-impressions has inspired Sam Gosling of the University of Texas at Austin and David Evans formerly of Classmates.com to launch an ambitious project to measure the accuracy of first-impressions worldwide (YouJustGetMe.com).
