= Climate ensemble =

Set of different models of the climate system

A climate ensemble involves slightly different models of the climate system. The ensemble average is expected to perform better than individual model runs. There are at least five types of ensemble, which differ in how the models of the ensemble are induced to vary.

== Aims ==
The aim of running an ensemble is usually in order to be able to deal with uncertainties in the system. An ultimate aim may be to produce policy relevant information such as a probability distribution function of different outcomes. This is proving to be very difficult due to a number of problems. These include:

1. The ensemble has to be wide-ranging to ensure it covers the whole range where the climate models may be good.
2. Measuring what is a good model is difficult. This may need to consider not only errors in the observation but also in the model.
3. Any prior assumptions about distribution can influence the probability distribution function produced.

== Types of ensembles ==
There are at least five different types of climate ensemble.

=== Multi-model ensemble ===
Multi-model ensembles (MMEs) are widely used in IPCC assessments, and a comprehensive collection of climate models can be accessed in the Coupled Model Intercomparison Project. Members of a multi-model ensemble are developed by different organisations involved in climate change research and can differ substantially in their software design and programming approach, their handling of spatial discretisation and exact formulation of physical, chemical and biological processes. The benefits of using a multi-model ensemble are seen in "the consistently better performance of the multi-model when considering all aspects of the predictions".

=== Perturbed physics ensemble ===
Perturbed physics ensembles (PPEs) form the main scientific focus of the Climateprediction.net project. Modern climate models do a good job of simulating many large-scale features of present-day climate. However, these models contain large numbers of adjustable parameters which are known, individually, to have a significant impact on simulated climate. While many of these are well constrained by observations, there are many which are subject to considerable uncertainty. We do not know the extent to which different choices of parameter-settings or schemes may provide equally realistic simulations of 20th century climate but different forecast for the 21st century. The most thorough way to investigate this uncertainty is to run a massive ensemble experiment in which each relevant parameter combination is investigated. A more general approach is coined "perturbed parameter ensemble" (also abbreviated as PPE), as apart from physical parameters other parameters, relating to the carbon cycle, atmospheric chemistry, land use etc. can be perturbed.

=== Initial condition ensemble ===
Initial condition ensembles involve the same model in terms of the same atmospheric physics parameters and forcings, but run from variety of different starting states. Because the climate system is chaotic, tiny changes in things such as temperatures, winds, and humidity in one place can lead to very different paths for the system as a whole. We can work around this by setting off several runs started with slightly different starting conditions, and then look at the evolution of the group as a whole. This is similar to what they do in weather forecasting.

Having an initial condition ensemble can help to identify natural variability in the system and deal with it.

=== Forcing ensemble ===
A model can be subjected to different forcings. These may correspond with different scenarios such as those described in the Special Report on Emissions Scenarios and more recently in the Representative Concentration Pathway.

=== Grand ensemble ===
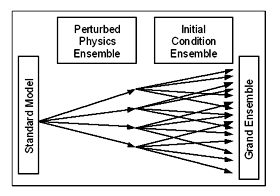
Grand Ensemble. Pictorial representation generated by Climateprediction.net.

A grand ensemble is an ensemble of ensembles. There has to be at least two nested ensembles. This is best illustrated in the diagram opposite.

== Applications ==
- Weather forecasting uses initial condition ensembles.
- Climate ensembles were used to project future changes in the occurrence of selected pests of crops.

== Analysis of climate ensembles ==
A variety of statistical methods can be used to analyze climate ensembles, such as Principal component analysis, Anova and Directional component analysis.

== See also ==
- Ensemble forecasting
- Ensemble (fluid mechanics)
- National Climate Projections
- Sensitivity analysis
- Uncertainty analysis
