= Transient modelling =

Transient modelling (also called time‑dependent modelling or unsteady simulation) is the practice of analysing physical, biological or socio‑economic processes whose state variables vary continuously with time. Unlike steady state (equilibrium) analysis—where only the initial and final conditions are considered—transient modelling follows the complete evolution of a system from one state to another, capturing the rates, lags and feedbacks that occur along the way.

== Scope ==
Transient techniques are used in any discipline where the governing equations (e.g. the Navier–Stokes equations, the heat equation, mass‑balance or cash‑flow equations) contain an explicit time derivative. Common fields include

- Computational fluid dynamics and multiphase flow (e.g. water‑hammer, surge analysis);
- groundwater and aquifer response;
- power system protection, stability and electromagnetic transients;
- climate modelling and palaeoclimate reconstruction;
- real‑time electricity grid balancing, traffic flow modelling, ecosystem dynamics and financial risk assessment.

== Mathematical foundation ==
Mathematically, transient problems are described by ordinary or partial differential equations of the general form

$$\frac{\partial \mathbf{u}}{\partial t}= \mathcal{F}(\mathbf{u},t,\nabla\mathbf{u})$$,

where $\mathbf{u}(t)$ is the state vector and $\mathcal{F}$ represents the physical laws and boundary conditions. Analytical solutions exist only for a limited class of simple geometries and linear systems (e.g. one‑dimensional heat conduction). Most practical applications therefore rely on numerical time‑integration schemes such as the explicit or implicit Euler method, Runge–Kutta methods or, for stiff systems, Crank–Nicolson and higher‑order multi‑step solvers.

== Applications ==
A simple example is a garden water tank. This is being topped up by rainfall from the roof, but when the tank is full, the remaining water goes to the drain. When the gardener draws water off, the level falls. If the garden is large and the summer is hot, a steady state will occur in summer where the tank is nearly always empty in summer. If the season is wet, the garden is getting water from the sky, and the tank is not being emptied sufficiently, so in steady state it will be observed to be always full. If the gardener has a way of observing the level of water in the tank, and a record of daily rainfall and temperatures, and is precisely metering the amount of water being drawn off every day, the numbers and the dates can be recorded in spreadsheet at daily intervals. After enough samples are taken, a chart can be developed to model the rise and fall pattern over a year, or over 2 years. With a better understanding of the process, it might emerge that a 200litre water tank would run out 20–25 days a year, but a 400-litre water tank would never run out, and a 300-litre tank would run out only 1-2 day a year and therefore that would be an acceptable risk and it would be the most economical solution.

One of the best examples of transient modelling is transient climate simulation. The analysis of ice cores in glaciers to understand climate change. Ice cores have thousands of layers, each of which represents a winter season of snowfall, and trapped in these are bubbles of air, particle of space dust and pollen which reveal climatic data of the time. By mapping these to a time scale, scientists can analyse the fluctuations over time and make predictions for the future.

Transient modelling is the basis of weather forecasting, of managing ecosystems, rail timetabling, managing the electricity grid, setting the national budget, floating currency, understanding traffic flows on a freeway, solar gains on glass fronted buildings, or even of checking the day-to-day transactions of one's monthly bank statement.

With the transient modelling approach, you understand the whole process better when the inputs and outputs are graphed against time.

== See also ==
- Dynamic system
- Time series analysis
- System dynamics
- Unsteady aerodynamics
