= Information integration theory =

Schematic diagram of information integration theory

Information integration theory was proposed by Norman H. Anderson to describe and model how a person integrates information from a number of sources in order to make an overall judgment. The theory proposes three functions.

The valuation function $V(S)$ is an empirically derived mapping of stimuli to an interval scale. It is unique up to an interval exchange transformation ($y = ax + b$).

The integration function $r = I\{s_1,s_2, .., s_n\}$ is an algebraic function combining the subjective values of the information. "Cognitive algebra" refers to the class of functions that are used to model the integration process. They may be adding, averaging, weighted averaging, multiplying, etc.

The response production function $R = M(r)$ is the process by which the internal impression is translated into an overt response.

Information integration theory differs from other theories in that it is not erected on a consistency principle such as balance or congruity but rather relies on algebraic models. The theory is also referred to as functional measurement, because it can provide validated scale values of the stimuli. An elementary treatment of the theory, along with a Microsoft Windows program for carrying out functional measurement analysis, is provided in the textbook by David J. Weiss.

== Integration models ==
There are three main types of algebraic models used in information integration theory: adding, averaging, and multiplying.
Adding models
$R =$ reaction/overt behavior
$F/G =$ contributing factors

$R_1 = F_1 + G_1$ (Condition 1)
$R_2 = F_2 + G_2$ (Condition 2)

Typically an experiment is designed so that:
$R_1=R_2$, and
$F_1>F_2$, so that
$G_1<G_2$.

There are two special cases known as discounting and augmentation.

Discounting: The value of any factor is reduced if other factors that produce the same effect are added.
Example: $F_2$ is not present or has a value of zero. If $F_1$ is positive, then G_{1} must be less than $G_2$.

Augmentation: An inverse version of the typical model.
Example: If $F_1$ is negative, then $G_1$ must be greater than $G_2$.

Two advantages of adding models:

1. Participants are not required to have an exact intuitive calculation
2. The adding model itself need not be completely valid. Certain kinds of interaction among the factors would not affect the qualitative conclusions.
