= Norman H. Anderson (psychologist) =

American psychologist (1925–2022)

- Born: Norman Henry Anderson; 23 July 1925
- Died: 29 August 2022 (aged 97)
- Education: University of Chicago (BS, MS), University of Wisconsin (MS, PhD)
- Known for: Information Integration Theory
- Scientific career
- Workplaces: University of California, San Diego

Norman Henry Anderson (July 23, 1925 – August 29, 2022) was an American social psychologist and the founder of Information integration theory.

Anderson was a Distinguished Professor Emeritus at the University of California, San Diego, where he was one of three founders of the Department of Psychology. He received a BS in 1946 and an MS in 1949 from the University of Chicago, and an MS in 1955 and a PhD in 1956 from the University of Wisconsin, with a thesis on Effect of First-order Conditional Probability in a Two-choice Learning Situation. Anderson also taught at The University of California, Los Angeles (UCLA) during the 1960s and 1970s, and is credited with developing Information Integration Theory.

Anderson was the winner of the 1972 AAAS Prize for Behavioral Science Research.

== Major published materials ==
=== Books ===
- Anderson, Norman; Berkowitz, Leonard (1978). Cognitive Theories in Social Psychology: Papers from the Advances in Experimental Social Psychology. Boston: Academic Press. ISBN 0-12-091850-1.
- Anderson, Norman (1981). Foundations of Information Integration Theory. Boston: Academic Press. ISBN 0-12-058101-9.
- Anderson, Norman (1982). Methods of Information Integration Theory. Boston: Academic Press. ISBN 0-12-058102-7.
- Anderson, Norman H. (1991). Contributions to Information Integration Theory. Mahwah, N.J: Erlbaum. ISBN 0-8058-0836-1.
- Anderson, Norman (1996). A Functional Theory of Cognition. Hillsdale, N.J: L. Erlbaum Associates. ISBN 0-8058-2244-5.
- Anderson, Norman (2001). Empirical Direction in Design and Analysis. Hillsdale, N.J: L. Erlbaum. ISBN 0-8058-3978-X.
- Anderson, Norman H (2008). Unified Social Cognition. Psychology Press.

=== Other publications ===
Anderson, N. H. & Hovland, C.I. The Representation of Order Effects in Communication Research. In C.I. Hovland (Ed.), The Order of Presentation in Persuasion, New Haven: Yale University Press, 1957

Anderson, N. H. Test of Averaging, Balance, and Congruity Theories. Paper presented at summer conference on mathematical models in social psychology. Kent, Connecticut, 1967.

Anderson, N. H. A Simple Model for Information Integration. In R.P. Abelson E. Aronson, W.J. McGuire, T.M. Newcomb, M.J. Rosenberg & P.H. Tannenbaum (Eds.), Theories of Cognitive Consistency: A Sourcebook., Chicago: Rand McNally, 1968.

Anderson, N. H. Algebraic Models in Perception. In E.C. Carterette & M.P. Friedman (Eds.), Handbook of Perception, Vol. 2. New York: Academic Press, 1973.

Anderson, N. H. Information Integration Theory: A Brief Survey. In D.H. Krantz, R.C. Atkinson, R.D. Luce, &P. Suppes (Eds.), Contemporary Developments in Mathematical Psychology, San Francisco: Freeman, 1974
