= Transient climate simulation =

A transient climate simulation is a mode of running a global climate model (GCM) in which a period of time (typically 1850–2100) is simulated with continuously-varying concentrations of greenhouse gases so that the climate of the model represents a realistic mode of possible change in the real world.

== Related models ==
This may be contrasted with an equilibrium climate simulation in which greenhouse gas concentrations are suddenly changed (typically from pre-industrial values to twice pre-industrial values) and the model allowed to come into equilibrium with the new forcing.

== History ==
Early GCMs used "swamp" or "slab" ocean models for reasons of computational simplicity. Such models cannot simulate the heat take up that occurs in the real ocean and were thus unable to run transient simulations: instead, the response to equilibrium change was investigated. There are problems with this approach, which were well appreciated at the time: the deep ocean has a very long time constant and in some areas (most notably the southern ocean) the transient and equilibrium responses are very different.

== Model interpretation issues ==
In an equilibrium simulation, time is merely a label and a given year or decade does not represent the simulation of a calendar year or decade.

- Thus (by definition) a portion of a simulation labelled "2000–2030" represents 30 years, but not any particular 30 years.
- In a transient simulation, instead of a sudden change in greenhouse gases and other forcings, the forcings are changed gradually, either in an idealised way (1% CO_{2} increase, for example) or a more realistic fashion (one of the scenarios described in the Special Report on Emissions Scenarios).

If the simulation is partly of the past, observed CO_{2} levels may be used (and perhaps solar variation, and volcanic forcing).

The transient simulation is intended to be a physically plausible path for the climate system to follow.

Although (given natural variability) even a perfect model would not simulate the year-to-year variations seen in the real world, in an ideal model the variation from decade to decade would track that of the real world.

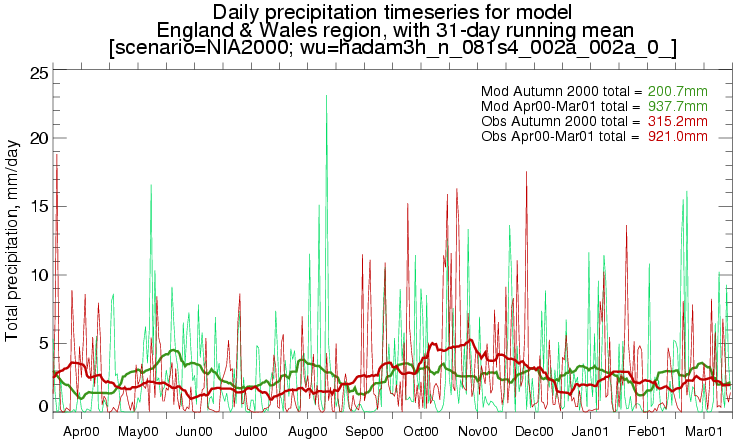
