= Ensemble (fluid mechanics) =

Imaginary collection of notionally identical experiments

In continuum mechanics, an ensemble is an imaginary collection of notionally identical experiments.

Each member of the ensemble will have nominally identical boundary conditions and fluid properties. If the flow is turbulent, the details of the fluid motion will differ from member to member because the experimental setup will be microscopically different, and these slight differences become magnified as time progresses. Members of an ensemble are, by definition, statistically independent of one another. The concept of ensemble is useful in thought experiments and to improve theoretical understanding of turbulence.

A good image to have in mind is a typical fluid mechanics experiment such as a mixing box. Imagine a million mixing boxes, distributed over the earth; at a predetermined time, a million fluid mechanics engineers each start one experiment, and monitor the flow. Each engineer then sends his or her results to a central database. Such a process would give results that are close to the theoretical ideal of an ensemble.

It is common to speak of ensemble average or ensemble averaging when considering a fluid mechanical ensemble.

For a completely unrelated type of averaging, see Reynolds-averaged Navier–Stokes equations (the two types of averaging are often confused).

== See also ==
- Statistical ensemble (mathematical physics)
