= Bjerknes' equation =

System of equations by V. Bjerknes

Bjerknes' equation refers to a set of seven different equations formulated by Vilhelm Bjerknes in 1904 which proposes a methodology to study large scale atmospheric motions using different atmospheric variables. It was one of the early attempts at model based weather forecasting which was until the early 20th century purely subjective and on an empirical basis. The derivations made here is hence fundamental to weather models in which it was used at least until the 1950s.

== Influence and Factors ==
Until the late 19th century, Weather forecasting was unreliable and subjective as it involved guesswork, local knowledge of climatology and usage of weather maps to reveal possible weather patterns in an area. This was followed by a development of thermodynamics which resulted in the completion of fundamental principles governing flow of atmosphere. It was understood by the meteorologist, Cleveland Abbe that applications of meteorology will require both hydrodynamics and thermodynamics. This development in the 1890s had started the numerical, analytical and graphical approach to weather forecasting.

In his 1904 paper titled "The problem of weather prediction as seen from the standpoint of mechanics and physics" (originally in the German language), Bjerknes first proposed a two step plan for his method of weather forecasting, which are Prognostic step in which the state of atmosphere is drawn by observations and the Diagnostic step in which equations will be used to predict the next state of atmosphere. Also Bjerknes inferred that a total of seven variables were needed to establish an idea of current and future state of atmosphere. These are―pressure, temperature, density, humidity and the three scalar components of flow velocity vector

Accompanied by the equations itself, Bjerknes proposed that to work with such a methodology will require graphical solutions for the equations which according to him would come later with advancing technologies.

== Equations ==
=== Hydrodynamics ===
There are three equations which are about the differential relations between pressure, density and three components of flow velocity which are:

Conservation of Mass

${\partial m \over \partial t} = {\partial \over \partial t} \int \rho V = 0$

Conservation of Momentum (Euler's equation or Navier–Stokes equation)

$\rho \, \biggl({\partial \vec u \over\partial t} + (\nabla . \vec u) \vec u\biggr) = - \nabla P + \rho \vec f$

where $\nabla P$ is the pressure gradient of fluid, $\rho \vec f$ is body force per unit volume and ${\partial \vec u \over\partial t}$ is the local acceleration of the fluid.

Conservation of Energy

${\partial\rho\over\partial t}(e_{tot}) = - \nabla \, . [(\rho e_{tot} + P)\vec u]$

where $e_{tot}$ is the total energy constituted by the internal energy $e$ and kinetic energy $u^2 \over 2$

=== Continuity ===
Continuity equation is also known as conservation of mass in motion.

${\partial\rho\over\partial t} = - \nabla \, . (\rho \vec u)$ also written as ${\partial\rho\over\partial t} = - \rho \, \nabla . \vec u$ for incompressible fluids where $\partial\rho\over\partial t$ is rate of change of density, $\rho$ is the density of fluid and $\rho \vec u$ is the mass flux of fluid.

=== State ===
Equation of State using either Ideal gas law or Van der Waals equation.

$PV = nRT$

where $T$ is the fluid temperature and $R$ is ideal gas constant

$\left(p + \frac{a}{V_\text{m}^2}\right)\left(V_\text{m} - b\right) = RT$

where $a$ is the attraction parameter, $b$ is the repulsion parameter and $V_m$ is the molar volume

=== Thermodynamics ===
First law of thermodynamics

$W + Q = \Delta E$

where $W$ is the work done on the system, $Q$ is the heat added to the system and $\Delta E$ is the total energy as addition of Kinetic, Potential and Internal energies of the system.

Second law of thermodynamics

$dS \geq 0$ (Note: Change to continuity equation of water was suggested. A1 v1 = A2 v2)

where $S$ represents the entropy of an isolated system.

== Legacy ==
The above work shown by Bjerknes extends to his later research on meteorology in which he had shown partial differential equations with varied definitions to estimate forces driving atmospheric motion. Together it were called Primitive equations.

L. F. Richardson using the equations by Bjerknes had made the first Numerical Weather Prediction (NWP) system which took six weeks for eight-hour period of atmospheric prediction in central Europe. It had its inaccuracies but the calculation requirements being so large had to be met by digital systems that would come in the 1940s.

In 1955, the first computer based weather prediction model generated by Joint Numerical Weather Prediction (JNWP) unit was a breakthrough as it had completed the objective that Bjerknes, Cleveland, Richardson and other meteorologists had set out to do.

== See also ==
- Navier–Stokes equations
- Primitive equations
- History of numerical weather prediction
