= Dissipation function =

Dissipation function may refer to

- Rayleigh's dissipation function
- Dissipation function under the fluctuation theorem
