= IGCM =

IGCM is an acronym for:

- Idiopathic giant cell myocarditis
- Incorporated Guild of Church Musicians
- Intermediate General Circulation Model
- Invasion Games Competence Model
- Ionospheric General Circulation Model
- International Gospel Christian Ministries
