= Mécanique analytique =

Book by Joseph-Louis Lagrange

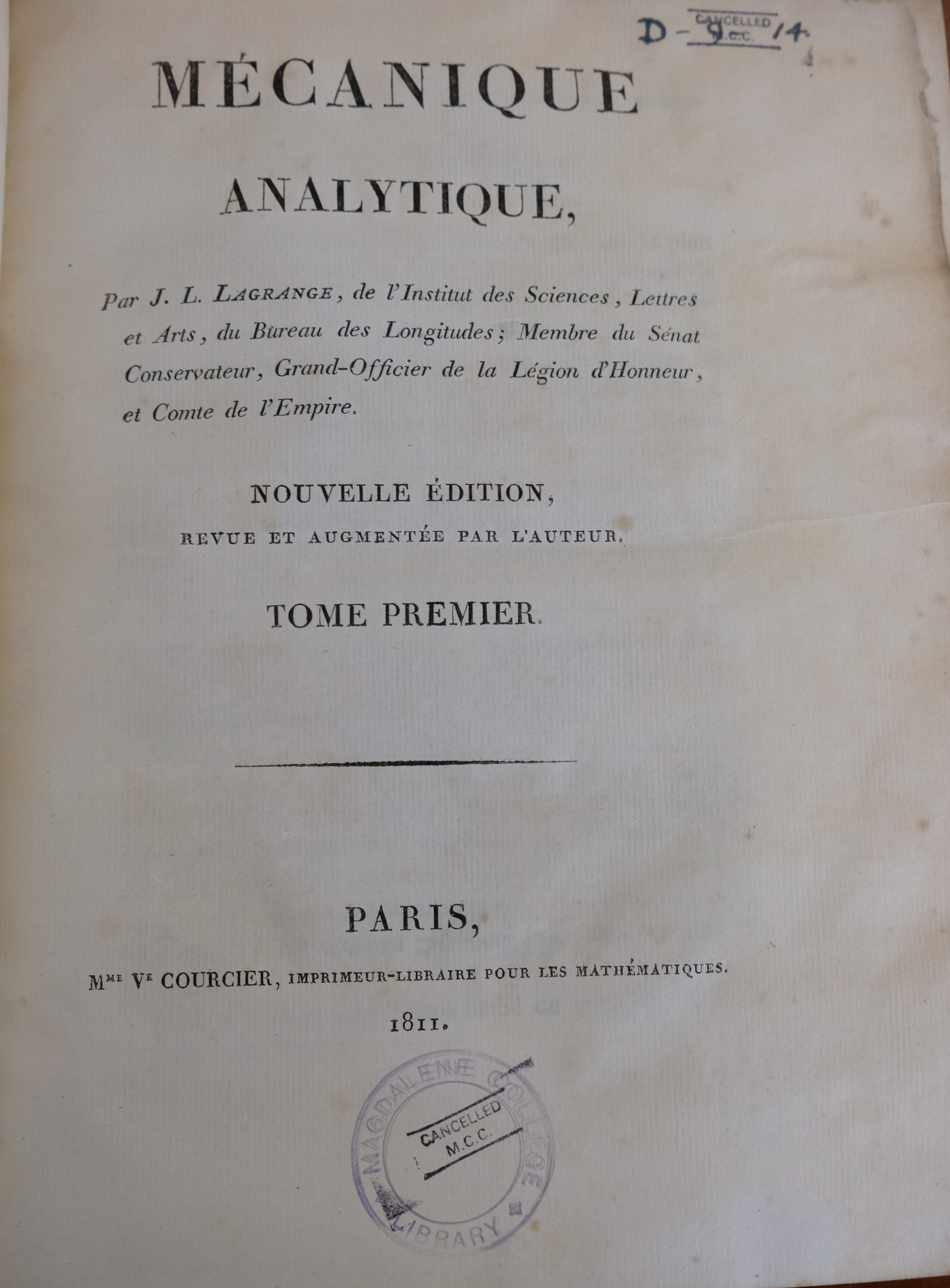
- 1811 copy of volume I of Mécanique Analytique
- Author: Joseph-Louis Lagrange
- Language: French
- Subject: Classical mechanics
- Genre: Non-fiction
- Publication date: 1788 (book 1); 1789 (book 2); 1815 (revised version)

Mécanique analytique (1788–89) is a two volume French treatise on analytical mechanics, written by Joseph-Louis Lagrange, and published 101 years after Isaac Newton's Philosophiæ Naturalis Principia Mathematica.

== Treatise ==
It consolidated into one unified and harmonious system, the scattered developments of contributors such as Alexis Clairaut, Jean le Rond d'Alembert, Pierre-Simon Laplace, Leonhard Euler, and Johann and Jacob Bernoulli in the historical transition from geometrical methods, as presented in Newton's Principia, to the methods of the calculus. The treatise expounds a great labor-saving and thought-saving general analytical method by which every mechanical question may be stated in a single differential equation.

Lagrange wrote that this work was entirely new and that his intent was to reduce the theory and the art of solving mechanics problems to general formulae, providing all the equations necessary for the solution of each problem. He stated that:

No diagrams will be found in this work. The methods that I explain require neither geometrical, nor mechanical, constructions or reasoning, but only algebraical operations in accordance with regular and uniform procedure. Those who love Analysis will see with pleasure that Mechanics has become a branch of it, and will be grateful to me for having thus extended its domain.

Ernst Mach describes the work as follows:

Analytic mechanics... was brought to the highest degree of perfection... Lagrange's aim is... to dispose, once and for all, of the reasoning necessary to resolve mechanical problems, by embodying as much as possible of it in a single formula. This he did. Every case... can now be dealt with by a very simple... schema; and whatever reasoning is left is performed by purely mechanical methods. The mechanics of Lagrange is a stupendous contribution to the economy of thought.

== Publication history ==
The work was first published in 1788 (volume 1) and 1789 (volume 2). Lagrange issued a substantially enlarged second edition of volume 1 in 1811, toward the end of his life. His revision of volume 2 was substantially complete at the time of his death in 1813, but was not published until 1815.

The second edition of 1811/15 has been translated into English, and is available online at archive.org.

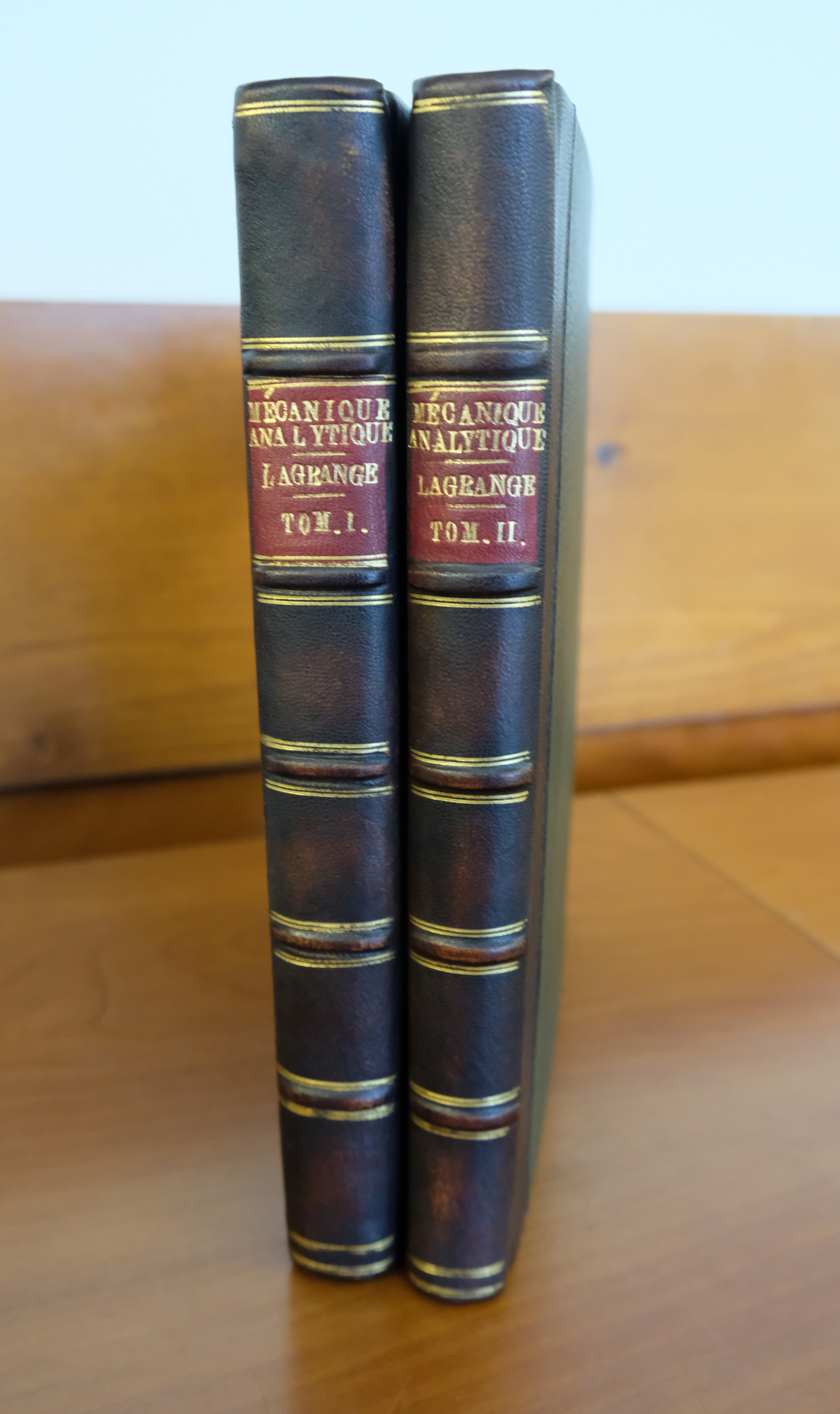
Volumes I-II of "Mécanique Analytique," from 1811 and 1815, respectively

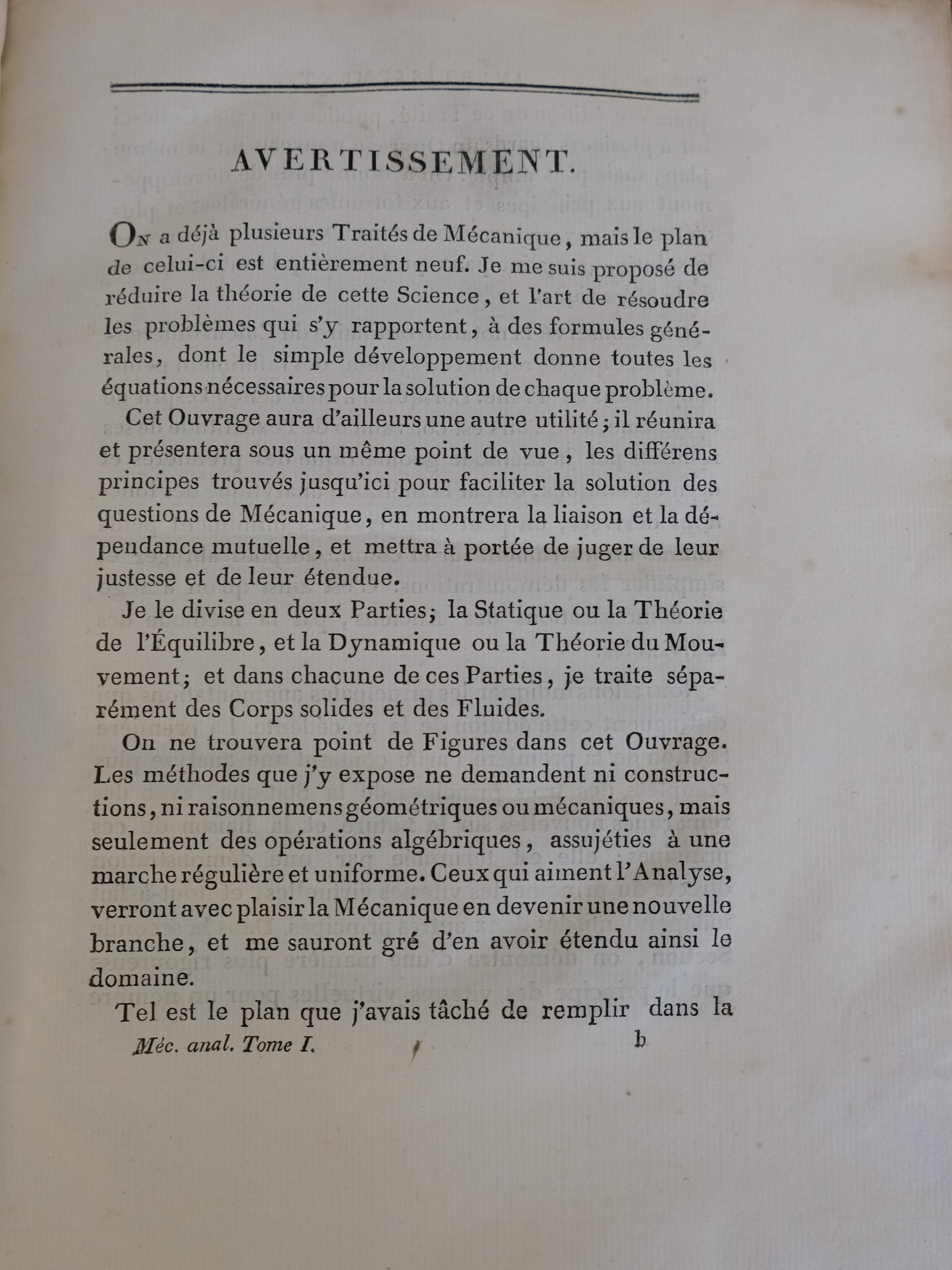
Avertissement of volume I of "Mécanique Analytique" (1811)

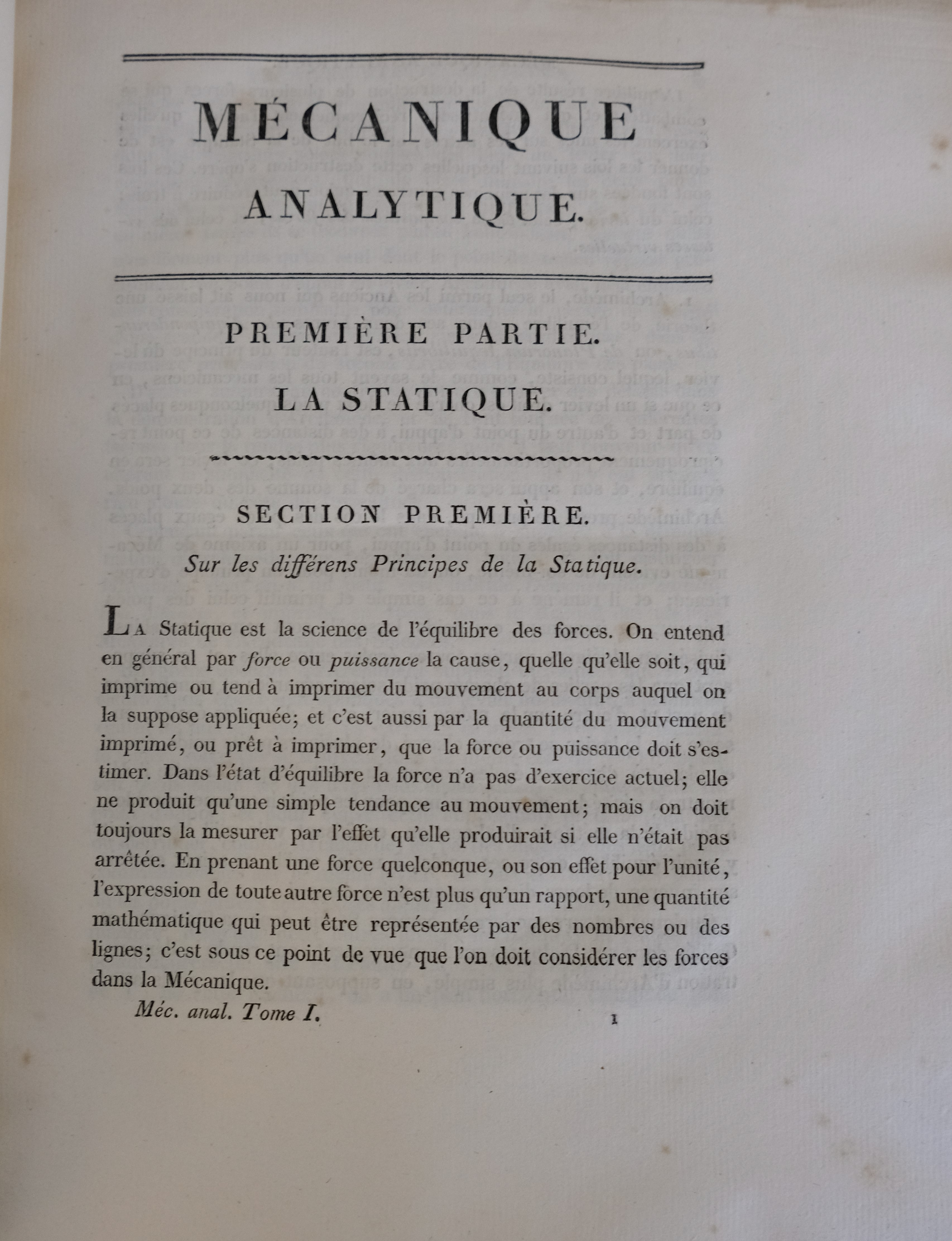
First page of volume I of "Mécanique Analytique" (1811)

== See also ==
- Calculus of variations
- Lagrangian mechanics
- Hamiltonian mechanics
