= Intermediate General Circulation Model =

The Reading Intermediate General Circulation Model (IGCM), is a simplified or "intermediate" global climate model, which is developed by members of the Department of Meteorology at the University of Reading, and by members of the Stratospheric Dynamics and Chemistry Group of the Department of Atmospheric and Oceanic Sciences at McGill University.

The IGCM is based on the primitive-equations baroclinic model of Hoskins and Simmons, which has been converted to run on workstations. Several variations have been developed by adjusting representations of the physics.

- IGCM1: Portable version of the original spectral, dry baroclinic model formulated in sigma-levels, with an option for Newtonian relaxation and Rayleigh friction, with no surface.
- IGCM2: Includes simplified moist parameterisations, a cheap "radiation scheme" (i.e. constant tropospheric cooling), a bulk formulation scheme for the boundary layer, fixed surface temperatures and humidity, uniform vertical diffusion, and can advect tracers.
- IGCM3x: Intermediate climate model that includes more sophisticated moisture/clouds parameterisations, a radiation scheme with various gas absorbers and a more realistic surface with an orography and land and sea surface schemes.

The adiabatic version, IGCM1, is freely available. Access to IGCM2 and IGCM3 is restricted to members of the Department of Meteorology at the University of Reading and collaborating researchers.

== See also ==
- Global climate model
