= Process study =

Process study is the phenomenological approach used in climatology. Process studies are used "to develop the parameterizations [e.g. of circulation models], and observations [are] used to calibrate [the latter]". A parametrization is a set of fitted equations to represent physical phenomena instead of deducing them from first principals. An example for a parametrized phenomenon are thunderstorms which cannot be simulated within a circulation model if the spatial resolution of several km is too coarse to resolve single storm cell.

== Other meanings ==
There is a journal entitled Process Studies.
