= Lagrangian mechanics =

Formulation of classical mechanics

In physics, Lagrangian mechanics is an alternate formulation of classical mechanics founded on the d'Alembert principle of virtual work. It was introduced by the Italian-French mathematician and astronomer Joseph-Louis Lagrange in his presentation to the Turin Academy of Science in 1760 culminating in his 1788 grand opus, Mécanique analytique. Lagrange's approach greatly simplifies the analysis of many problems in mechanics, and it had crucial influence on other branches of physics, including relativity and quantum field theory.

Lagrangian mechanics describes a mechanical system as a pair (M, L) consisting of a configuration space M and a smooth function $L$ within that space called a Lagrangian. For many systems, L = T − V, where T and V are the kinetic and potential energy of the system, respectively.

The stationary action principle requires that the action functional of the system derived from L must remain at a stationary point (specifically, a maximum, minimum, or saddle point) throughout the time evolution of the system. This constraint allows the calculation of the equations of motion of the system using Lagrange's equations.

== Introduction ==
Bead constrained to move on a frictionless wire. The wire exerts a reaction force C on the bead to keep it on the wire. The non-constraint force N in this case is gravity. Notice the initial position of the bead on the wire can lead to different motions.

Simple pendulum. Since the rod is rigid, the position of the bob is constrained according to the equation f(x, y) = 0, the constraint force C is the tension in the rod. Again the non-constraint force N in this case is gravity.

Newton's laws and the concept of forces are the usual starting point for teaching about mechanical systems. This method works well for many problems, but for others the approach is prohibitively complicated. For example, in the calculation of the motion of a torus rolling on a horizontal surface with a pearl sliding inside, the time-varying constraint forces like the angular velocity of the torus and the motion of the pearl in relation to the torus made it difficult to determine the motion of the torus with Newton's equations. Lagrangian mechanics adopts energy rather than force as its basic ingredient, leading to more abstract equations capable of tackling more complex problems.

Particularly, Lagrange's approach was to set up independent generalized coordinates for the position and speed of every object, which allows the writing down of a general form of the Lagrangian (total kinetic energy minus potential energy of the system) and summing this over all possible paths of motion of the particles yielded a formula for the 'action', which he minimized to give a generalized set of equations. This summed quantity is minimized along the path that the particle actually takes. This choice eliminates the need for the constraint force to enter into the resultant generalized system of equations. There are fewer equations since one is not directly calculating the influence of the constraint on the particle at a given moment.

For a wide variety of physical systems, if the size and shape of a massive object are negligible, it is a useful simplification to treat it as a point particle. For a system of N point particles with masses m_{1}, m_{2}, ..., m_{N}, each particle has a position vector, denoted r_{1}, r_{2}, ..., r_{N}. Cartesian coordinates are often sufficient, so r_{1} = (x_{1}, y_{1}, z_{1}), r_{2} = (x_{2}, y_{2}, z_{2}) and so on. In three-dimensional space, each position vector requires three coordinates to uniquely define the location of a point, so there are 3N coordinates to uniquely define the configuration of the system. These are all specific points in space to locate the particles; a general point in space is written r = (x, y, z). The velocity of each particle is how fast the particle moves along its path of motion, and is the time derivative of its position, thus
$$\mathbf{v}_1 = \frac{d\mathbf{r}_1}{dt},
\mathbf{v}_2 = \frac{d\mathbf{r}_2}{dt},
\ldots,
\mathbf{v}_N = \frac{d\mathbf{r}_N}{dt}.$$
In Newtonian mechanics, the equations of motion are given by Newton's laws. The second law "net force equals mass times acceleration",
$$\sum \mathbf{F} = m \frac{d^2\mathbf{r}}{dt^2},$$
applies to each particle. For an N-particle system in 3 dimensions, there are 3N second-degree ordinary differential equations in the positions of the particles to solve for.

=== Lagrangian ===
Instead of forces, Lagrangian mechanics uses the energies in the system. The central quantity of Lagrangian mechanics is the Lagrangian, a function which summarizes the dynamics of the entire system. Overall, the Lagrangian has units of energy, but no single expression for all physical systems. Any function which generates the correct equations of motion, in agreement with physical laws, can be taken as a Lagrangian. It is nevertheless possible to construct general expressions for large classes of applications. The non-relativistic Lagrangian for a system of particles in the absence of an electromagnetic field is given by
$$L = T - V,$$
where
$$T = \frac{1}{2} \sum_{k=1}^N m_k v^2_k$$
is the total kinetic energy of the system, equaling the sum Σ of the kinetic energies of the $N$ particles. Each particle labeled $k$ has mass $m_k,$ and v_{k}^{2} = v_{k} · v_{k} is the magnitude squared of its velocity, equivalent to the dot product of the velocity with itself.

Kinetic energy T is the energy of the system's motion and is a function only of the velocities v_{k}, not the positions r_{k}, nor time t, so T = T(v_{1}, v_{2}, ...).

V, the potential energy of the system, reflects the energy of interaction between the particles, i.e. how much energy any one particle has due to all the others, together with any external influences. For conservative forces (e.g. Newtonian gravity), it is a function of the position vectors of the particles only, so V = V(r_{1}, r_{2}, ...). For those non-conservative forces which can be derived from an appropriate potential (e.g. electromagnetic potential), the velocities will appear also, V = V(r_{1}, r_{2}, ..., v_{1}, v_{2}, ...). If there is some external field or external driving force changing with time, the potential changes with time, so most generally V = V(r_{1}, r_{2}, ..., v_{1}, v_{2}, ..., t).

=== Mathematical formulation (for finite particle systems) ===
An equivalent but more mathematically formal definition of the Lagrangian is as follows. For a system of N particles in three-dimensional space, the configuration space of the system is a smooth manifold $Q \subseteq \mathbb{R}^{3N}$, where each configuration $q \in Q$ specifies the spatial positions of each of the particles at a given instant of time, and the manifold is composed of all the configurations that are allowed by the constraints on the system.

The Lagrangian is a smooth function: $L : TQ \times \mathbb{R} \to \mathbb{R},$ where $TQ \subseteq \mathbb{R}^{6N}$ is the tangent bundle of the configuration space. That is, each element in $TQ$ represents both the positions and the velocities of the particles, and can be written as a tuple $(q_1,\ldots, q_N,\dot q_1,\ldots \dot q_N)$ with $q_i$ and $\dot q_i$ specifying a position and a velocity of the i'th particle respectively. The time dependence $t \in \mathbb{R}$ allows for the Lagrangian to describe time-dependent forces or potentials.

A trajectory of the system is a smooth function $q : [t_0, t_1] \to Q,$ describing the evolution of the configuration over time. Its velocity is the time derivative $\dot{q}(t) \in T_{q(t)}Q$ of $q(t)$, and the pair $(q(t),\dot q(t)) \in TQ$ is thus an element of the bundle for any $t$. The action functional of the trajectory can therefore be defined as the integral of the Lagrangian along the path: $S[q] = \int_{t_0}^{t_1} L(q(t), \dot{q}(t), t) \, dt.$

The laws of motion in Lagrangian mechanics are derived from the postulate that among all trajectories between two given configurations, the actual one that will be taken by the system must be a critical point (often but not necessarily a local minimum) of the action functional. This leads to the Euler–Lagrange equations (see also below).

== Equations of motion ==
For a system of particles with masses $m_1, \ldots, m_N$, the kinetic energy is: $T(q, \dot{q}) = \frac{1}{2} \sum_{i=1}^N m_i \|\dot{q}_i\|^2,$ where $\dot{q}_i \in \mathbb{R}^3$ is the velocity of particle i.

The potential energy $V(q, t)$ depends only on the configuration (and possibly on time), and typically arises from conservative forces.

The standard Lagrangian is given by the difference: $L(q, \dot{q}, t) = T(q, \dot{q}) - V(q, t).$

This formulation covers both conservative and time-dependent systems and forms the basis for generalizations to continuous systems (fields), constrained systems, and systems with curved configuration spaces.

If T or V or both depend explicitly on time due to time-varying constraints or external influences, the Lagrangian L(r_{1}, r_{2}, ... v_{1}, v_{2}, ... t) is explicitly time-dependent. If neither the potential nor the kinetic energy depend on time, then the Lagrangian L(r_{1}, r_{2}, ... v_{1}, v_{2}, ...) is explicitly independent of time. In either case, the Lagrangian always has implicit time dependence through the generalized coordinates.

With these definitions, Lagrange's equations are

Lagrange's equations

$\frac{\partial L}{\partial \mathbf{r}_k} - \frac{\mathrm{d}}{\mathrm{d}t}\frac{\partial L}{\partial \dot{\mathbf{r}}_k} + \sum_{i=1}^C \lambda_i\frac{\partial f_i}{\partial \mathbf{r}_k} = 0,$

where k = 1, 2, ..., N labels the particles, there is a Lagrange multiplier λ_{i} for each constraint equation f_{i}, and
$$\frac{\partial}{\partial \mathbf{r}_k} \equiv \left(\frac{\partial}{\partial x_k}, \frac{\partial}{\partial y_k}, \frac{\partial}{\partial z_k}\right), \quad
\frac{\partial}{\partial \dot{\mathbf{r}}_k} \equiv \left(\frac{\partial}{\partial \dot{x}_k}, \frac{\partial}{\partial \dot{y}_k}, \frac{\partial}{\partial \dot{z}_k}\right)$$
are each shorthands for a vector of partial derivatives ∂/∂ with respect to the indicated variables (not a derivative with respect to the entire vector). (Note: Sometimes in this context the variational derivative denoted and defined as $$\frac{\delta}{\delta \mathbf{r}_k} \equiv \frac{\partial}{\partial \mathbf{r}_k} - \frac{\mathrm{d}}{\mathrm{d}t}\frac{\partial}{\partial \dot{\mathbf{r}}_k}$$ is used. Throughout this article only partial and total derivatives are used.) Each overdot is a shorthand for a time derivative. This procedure does increase the number of equations to solve compared to Newton's laws, from 3N to 3N + C, because there are 3N coupled second-order differential equations in the position coordinates and multipliers, plus C constraint equations. However, when solved alongside the position coordinates of the particles, the multipliers can yield information about the constraint forces. The coordinates do not need to be eliminated by solving the constraint equations.

In the Lagrangian, the position coordinates and velocity components are all independent variables, and derivatives of the Lagrangian are taken with respect to these separately according to the usual differentiation rules (e.g. the partial derivative of L with respect to the z velocity component of particle 2, defined by v_{z,2} = dz_{2}/dt, is just ∂L/∂v_{z,2}; no awkward chain rules or total derivatives need to be used to relate the velocity component to the corresponding coordinate z_{2}).

In each constraint equation, one coordinate is redundant because it is determined from the other coordinates. The number of independent coordinates is therefore n = 3N − C. We can transform each position vector to a common set of n generalized coordinates, conveniently written as an n-tuple q = (q_{1}, q_{2}, ... q_{n}), by expressing each position vector, and hence the position coordinates, as functions of the generalized coordinates and time:
$$\mathbf{r}_k = \mathbf{r}_k(\mathbf{q}, t) = \big(x_k(\mathbf{q}, t), y_k(\mathbf{q}, t), z_k(\mathbf{q}, t), t\big).$$

The vector q is a point in the configuration space of the system. The time derivatives of the generalized coordinates are called the generalized velocities, and for each particle the transformation of its velocity vector, the total derivative of its position with respect to time, is
$$\dot{q}_j = \frac{\mathrm{d}q_j}{\mathrm{d}t}, \quad
\mathbf{v}_k = \sum_{j=1}^n \frac{\partial \mathbf{r}_k}{\partial q_j}\dot{q}_j + \frac{\partial \mathbf{r}_k}{\partial t}.$$

Given this v_{k}, the kinetic energy in generalized coordinates depends on the generalized velocities, generalized coordinates, and time if the position vectors depend explicitly on time due to time-varying constraints, so $T = T(\mathbf{q}, \dot{\mathbf{q}}, t).$

With these definitions, the Euler–Lagrange equations,

Lagrange's equations

$\frac{\mathrm{d}}{\mathrm{d}t} \left( \frac{\partial L}{\partial \dot{q}_j} \right) = \frac{\partial L}{\partial q_j}$

are mathematical results from the calculus of variations, which can also be used in mechanics. Substituting in the Lagrangian L(q, dq/dt, t) gives the equations of motion of the system. The number of equations has decreased compared to Newtonian mechanics, from 3N to n = 3N − C coupled second-order differential equations in the generalized coordinates. These equations do not include constraint forces at all, only non-constraint forces need to be accounted for.

Although the equations of motion include partial derivatives, the results of the partial derivatives are still ordinary differential equations in the position coordinates of the particles. The total time derivative denoted d/dt often involves implicit differentiation. Both equations are linear in the Lagrangian, but generally are nonlinear coupled equations in the coordinates.

=== Extensions ===
As already noted, this form of L is applicable to many important classes of system, but not everywhere. For relativistic Lagrangian mechanics it must be replaced as a whole by a function consistent with special relativity (scalar under Lorentz transformations) or general relativity (4-scalar). Where a magnetic field is present, the expression for the potential energy needs restating. And for dissipative forces (e.g., friction), another function must be introduced alongside Lagrangian often referred to as a "Rayleigh dissipation function" to account for the loss of energy.

One or more of the particles may each be subject to one or more holonomic constraints; such a constraint is described by an equation of the form f(r, t) = 0. If the number of constraints in the system is C, then each constraint has an equation f_{1}(r, t) = 0, f_{2}(r, t) = 0, ..., f_{C}(r, t) = 0, each of which could apply to any of the particles. If particle k is subject to constraint i, then f_{i}(r_{k}, t) = 0. At any instant of time, the coordinates of a constrained particle are linked together and not independent. The constraint equations determine the allowed paths the particles can move along, but not where they are or how fast they go at every instant of time. Nonholonomic constraints depend on the particle velocities, accelerations, or higher derivatives of position. Lagrangian mechanics can only be applied to systems whose constraints, if any, are all holonomic. Three examples of nonholonomic constraints are: when the constraint equations are non-integrable, when the constraints have inequalities, or when the constraints involve complicated non-conservative forces like friction. Nonholonomic constraints require special treatment, and one may have to revert to Newtonian mechanics or use other methods.

== History ==
=== Newton's laws ===
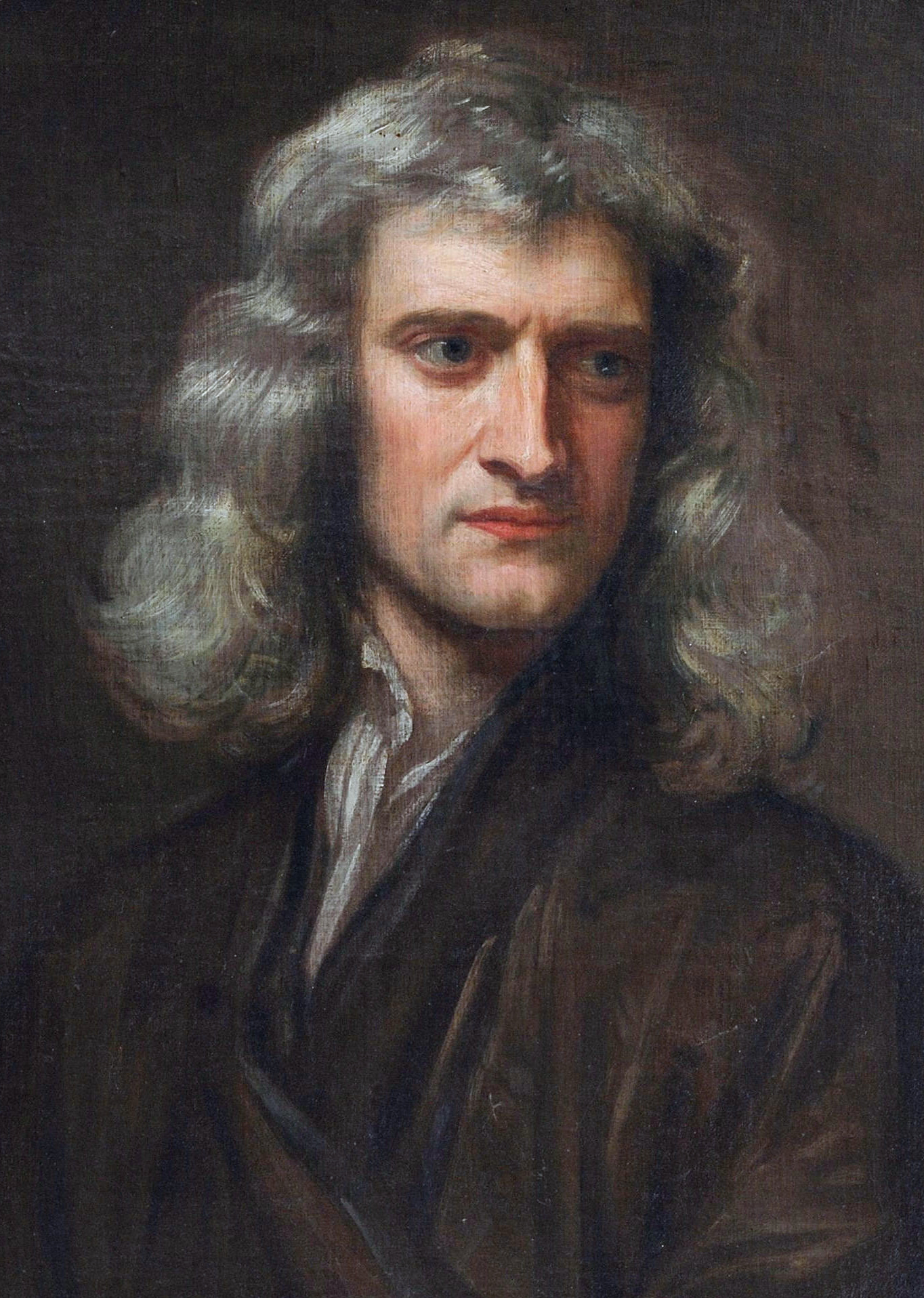
Isaac Newton (1642–1727)

For simplicity, Newton's laws can be illustrated for one particle without much loss of generality (for a system of N particles, all of these equations apply to each particle in the system). The equation of motion for a particle of constant mass m is Newton's second law of 1687, in modern vector notation
$$\mathbf{F} = m \mathbf{a},$$
where a is its acceleration and F the resultant force acting on it. Where the mass is varying, the equation needs to be generalised to take the time derivative of the momentum. In three spatial dimensions, this is a system of three coupled second-order ordinary differential equations to solve, since there are three components in this vector equation. The solution is the position vector r of the particle at time t, subject to the initial conditions of r and v when t = 0.

Newton's laws are easy to use in Cartesian coordinates, but Cartesian coordinates are not always convenient, and for other coordinate systems the equations of motion can become complicated. In a set of curvilinear coordinates ξ = (ξ^{1}, ξ^{2}, ξ^{3}), the law in tensor index notation is the "Lagrangian form"
$$F^a = m \left( \frac{\mathrm{d}^2 \xi^a}{\mathrm{d}t^2} + \Gamma^a{}_{bc} \frac{\mathrm{d}\xi^b}{\mathrm{d}t}\frac{\mathrm{d}\xi^c}{\mathrm{d}t} \right) = g^{ak} \left(\frac{\mathrm{d}}{\mathrm{d}t} \frac{\partial T}{\partial \dot{\xi}^k} - \frac{\partial T}{\partial \xi^k}\right), \quad
\dot{\xi}^a \equiv \frac{\mathrm{d} \xi^a }{\mathrm{d}t},$$
where F^{a} is the a-th contravariant component of the resultant force acting on the particle, Γ^{a}_{bc} are the Christoffel symbols of the second kind,
$$T = \frac{1}{2} m g_{bc} \frac{\mathrm{d} \xi^b}{\mathrm{d}t} \frac{\mathrm{d} \xi^c}{\mathrm{d}t}$$
is the kinetic energy of the particle, and g_{bc} the covariant components of the metric tensor of the curvilinear coordinate system. All the indices a, b, c, each take the values 1, 2, 3. Curvilinear coordinates are not the same as generalized coordinates.

It may seem like an overcomplication to cast Newton's law in this form, but there are advantages. The acceleration components in terms of the Christoffel symbols can be avoided by evaluating derivatives of the kinetic energy instead. If there is no resultant force acting on the particle, F = 0, it does not accelerate, but moves with constant velocity in a straight line. Mathematically, the solutions of the differential equation are geodesics, the curves of extremal length between two points in space (these may end up being minimal, that is the shortest paths, but not necessarily). In flat 3D real space the geodesics are simply straight lines. So for a free particle, Newton's second law coincides with the geodesic equation and states that free particles follow geodesics, the extremal trajectories it can move along. If the particle is subject to forces F ≠ 0, the particle accelerates due to forces acting on it and deviates away from the geodesics it would follow if free. With appropriate extensions of the quantities given here in flat 3D space to 4D curved spacetime, the above form of Newton's law also carries over to Einstein's general relativity, in which case free particles follow geodesics in curved spacetime that are no longer "straight lines" in the ordinary sense.

However, we still need to know the total resultant force F acting on the particle, which in turn requires the resultant non-constraint force N plus the resultant constraint force C,
$$\mathbf{F} = \mathbf{C} + \mathbf{N}.$$

The constraint forces can be complicated, since they generally depend on time. Also, if there are constraints, the curvilinear coordinates are not independent but related by one or more constraint equations.

The constraint forces can either be eliminated from the equations of motion, so only the non-constraint forces remain, or included by including the constraint equations in the equations of motion.

=== D'Alembert's principle ===
A fundamental result in analytical mechanics is D'Alembert's principle, introduced in 1708 by Jacques Bernoulli to understand static equilibrium, and developed by D'Alembert in 1743 to solve dynamical problems. The principle asserts for N particles the virtual work, i.e. the work along a virtual displacement, $\delta \mathbf{r}_k$, is zero:
$$\sum_{k=1}^N ( \mathbf {N}_k + \mathbf {C}_k - m_k \mathbf{a}_k )\cdot \delta \mathbf{r}_k = 0.$$

One degree of freedom.

Two degrees of freedom.

Constraint force C and virtual displacement δr for a particle of mass m confined to a curve. The resultant non-constraint force is N.

The virtual displacements, $\delta \mathbf{r}_k$, are by definition infinitesimal changes in the configuration of the system consistent with the constraint forces acting on the system at an instant of time, i.e. in such a way that the constraint forces maintain the constrained motion. They are not the same as the actual displacements in the system, which are caused by the resultant constraint and non-constraint forces acting on the particle to accelerate and move it. (Note: Here the virtual displacements are assumed reversible, it is possible for some systems to have non-reversible virtual displacements that violate this principle, see Udwadia–Kalaba equation.) Virtual work is the work done along a virtual displacement for any force (constraint or non-constraint).

Since the constraint forces act perpendicular to the motion of each particle in the system to maintain the constraints, the total virtual work by the constraint forces acting on the system is zero: (Note: In other words $$\mathbf{C}_k\cdot\delta\mathbf{r}_k = 0$$ for particle k subject to a constraint force, however $$C_{k\,x} \delta x_k \neq 0,\quad C_{k\,y} \delta y_k \neq 0,\quad C_{k\,z} \delta z_k \neq 0$$ because of the constraint equations on the r_{k} coordinates.)
$$\sum_{k=1}^N \mathbf {C}_k \cdot \delta \mathbf{r}_k = 0,$$
so that
$$\sum_{k=1}^N (\mathbf {N}_k - m_k \mathbf{a}_k ) \cdot \delta \mathbf{r}_k = 0.$$

Thus D'Alembert's principle allows us to concentrate on only the applied non-constraint forces, and exclude the constraint forces in the equations of motion. The form shown is also independent of the choice of coordinates. However, it cannot be readily used to set up the equations of motion in an arbitrary coordinate system since the displacements $\delta \mathbf{r}_k$ might be connected by a constraint equation, which prevents us from setting the N individual summands to 0. We will therefore seek a system of mutually independent coordinates for which the total sum will be 0 if and only if the individual summands are 0. Setting each of the summands to 0 will eventually give us our separated equations of motion.

=== Equations of motion from D'Alembert's principle ===
If there are constraints on particle k, then since the coordinates of the position r_{k} = (x_{k}, y_{k}, z_{k}) are linked together by a constraint equation, so are those of the virtual displacements δr_{k} = (δx_{k}, δy_{k}, δz_{k}). Since the generalized coordinates are independent, we can avoid the complications with the δr_{k} by converting to virtual displacements in the generalized coordinates. These are related in the same form as a total differential,
$$\delta \mathbf{r}_k = \sum_{j=1}^n \frac {\partial \mathbf{r}_k} {\partial q_j} \delta q_j.$$

There is no partial time derivative with respect to time multiplied by a time increment, since this is a virtual displacement, one along the constraints in an instant of time.

The first term in D'Alembert's principle above is the virtual work done by the non-constraint forces N_{k} along the virtual displacements δr_{k}, and can without loss of generality be converted into the generalized analogues by the definition of generalized forces
$$Q_j = \sum_{k=1}^N \mathbf {N}_k \cdot \frac{\partial \mathbf{r}_k}{\partial q_j},$$
so that
$$\sum_{k=1}^N \mathbf{N}_k \cdot \delta \mathbf{r}_k = \sum_{k=1}^N  \mathbf {N}_k \cdot \sum_{j=1}^n \frac {\partial \mathbf{r}_k} {\partial q_j} \delta q_j = \sum_{j=1}^n Q_j \delta q_j.$$

This is half of the conversion to generalized coordinates. It remains to convert the acceleration term into generalized coordinates, which is not immediately obvious. Recalling the Lagrange form of Newton's second law, the partial derivatives of the kinetic energy with respect to the generalized coordinates and velocities can be found to give the desired result:
$$\sum_{k=1}^N m_k \mathbf{a}_k \cdot \frac {\partial \mathbf{r}_k}{\partial q_j} = \frac{\mathrm{d}}{\mathrm{d}t}\frac{\partial T}{\partial \dot{q}_j} - \frac{\partial T}{\partial q_j}.$$

Now D'Alembert's principle is in the generalized coordinates as required,
$$\sum_{j=1}^n \left[ Q_j - \left(\frac{\mathrm{d}}{\mathrm{d}t}\frac{\partial T}{\partial \dot{q}_j} - \frac{\partial T}{\partial q_j} \right) \right] \delta q_j = 0,$$
and since these virtual displacements δq_{j} are independent and nonzero, the coefficients can be equated to zero, resulting in Lagrange's equations or the generalized equations of motion,
$$Q_j = \frac{\mathrm{d}}{\mathrm{d}t}\frac{\partial T}{\partial \dot{q}_j} - \frac{\partial T}{\partial q_j}$$

These equations are equivalent to Newton's laws for the non-constraint forces. The generalized forces in this equation are derived from the non-constraint forces only – the constraint forces have been excluded from D'Alembert's principle and do not need to be found. The generalized forces may be non-conservative, provided they satisfy D'Alembert's principle.

=== Euler–Lagrange equations and Hamilton's principle ===
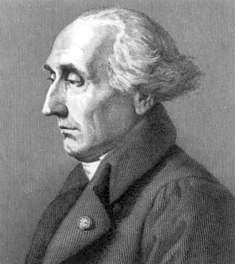
Joseph-Louis Lagrange (1736–1813)

For a non-conservative force which depends on velocity, it may be possible to find a potential energy function V that depends on positions and velocities. If the generalized forces Q_{i} can be derived from a potential V such that
$$Q_j = \frac{\mathrm{d}}{\mathrm{d}t}\frac{\partial V}{\partial \dot{q}_j} - \frac{\partial V}{\partial q_j},$$
equating to Lagrange's equations and defining the Lagrangian as L = T − V obtains Lagrange's equations of the second kind or the Euler–Lagrange equations of motion
$$\frac{\partial L}{\partial q_j} - \frac{\mathrm{d}}{\mathrm{d}t}\frac{\partial L}{\partial \dot{q}_j}  = 0.$$

However, the Euler–Lagrange equations can only account for non-conservative forces if a potential can be found as shown. This may not always be possible for non-conservative forces, and Lagrange's equations do not involve any potential, only generalized forces; therefore they are more general than the Euler–Lagrange equations.

The Euler–Lagrange equations also follow from the calculus of variations. The variation of the Lagrangian is
$$\delta L = \sum_{j=1}^n \left(\frac{\partial L}{\partial q_j} \delta q_j + \frac{\partial L}{\partial \dot{q}_j} \delta \dot{q}_j \right),\quad \delta \dot{q}_j \equiv \delta\frac{\mathrm{d}q_j}{\mathrm{d}t} \equiv \frac{\mathrm{d}(\delta q_j)}{\mathrm{d}t},$$
which has a form similar to the total differential of L, but the virtual displacements and their time derivatives replace differentials, and there is no time increment in accordance with the definition of the virtual displacements. An integration by parts with respect to time can transfer the time derivative of δq_{j} to the ∂L/∂(dq_{j}/dt), in the process exchanging d(δq_{j})/dt for δq_{j}, allowing the independent virtual displacements to be factorized from the derivatives of the Lagrangian,
$$\begin{align}
\int_{t_1}^{t_2} \delta L \, \mathrm{d}t & =\int_{t_1}^{t_2} \sum_{j=1}^n \left(\frac{\partial L}{\partial q_j}\delta q_j +\frac{\mathrm{d}}{\mathrm{d}t} \left(\frac{\partial L}{\partial \dot{q}_j}\delta q_j\right) - \frac{\mathrm{d}}{\mathrm{d}t}\frac{\partial L}{\partial \dot{q}_j}\delta q_j \right) \, \mathrm{d}t
\\ &= \sum_{j=1}^n\left[\frac{\partial L}{\partial \dot{q}_j}\delta q_j\right]_{t_1}^{t_2} + \int_{t_1}^{t_2} \sum_{j=1}^n \left(\frac{\partial L}{\partial q_j} - \frac{\mathrm{d}}{\mathrm{d}t}\frac{\partial L}{\partial \dot{q}_j} \right)\delta q_j \, \mathrm{d}t.
\end{align}$$

Now, if the condition δq_{j}(t_{1}) = δq_{j}(t_{2}) = 0 holds for all j, the terms not integrated are zero. If in addition the entire time integral of δL is zero, then because the δq_{j} are independent, and the only way for a definite integral to be zero is if the integrand equals zero, each of the coefficients of δq_{j} must also be zero. Then we obtain the equations of motion. This can be summarized by Hamilton's principle :
$$\int_{t_1}^{t_2}\delta L \, \mathrm{d}t = 0.$$

The time integral of the Lagrangian is another quantity called the action, defined as
$$S = \int_{t_1}^{t_2} L\,\mathrm{d}t,$$
which is a functional; it takes in the Lagrangian function for all times between t_{1} and t_{2} and returns a scalar value. Its dimensions are the same as [angular momentum], [energy]·[time], or [length]·[momentum]. With this definition Hamilton's principle is
$$\delta S = 0.$$

As the system evolves, q traces a path through configuration space (only some are shown). The path taken by the system (red) has a stationary action (δS = 0) under small changes in the configuration of the system (δq).

Instead of thinking about particles accelerating in response to applied forces, one might think of them picking out the path with a stationary action, with the end points of the path in configuration space held fixed at the initial and final times. Hamilton's principle is one of several action principles.

Historically, the idea of finding the shortest path a particle can follow subject to a force motivated the first applications of the calculus of variations to mechanical problems, such as the Brachistochrone problem solved by Jean Bernoulli in 1696, as well as Leibniz, Daniel Bernoulli, L'Hôpital around the same time, and Newton the following year. Newton himself was thinking along the lines of the variational calculus, but did not publish. These ideas in turn lead to the variational principles of mechanics, of Fermat, Maupertuis, Euler, Hamilton, and others.

Hamilton's principle can be applied to nonholonomic constraints if the constraint equations can be put into a certain form, a linear combination of first order differentials in the coordinates. The resulting constraint equation can be rearranged into first order differential equation. This will not be given here.

=== Lagrange multipliers and constraints ===
The Lagrangian L can be varied in the Cartesian r_{k} coordinates, for N particles,
$$\int_{t_1}^{t_2} \sum_{k=1}^N \left(\frac{\partial L}{\partial \mathbf{r}_k} - \frac{\mathrm{d}}{\mathrm{d}t}\frac{\partial L}{\partial \dot{\mathbf{r}}_k} \right)\cdot\delta \mathbf{r}_k \, \mathrm{d}t = 0.$$

Hamilton's principle is still valid even if the coordinates L is expressed in are not independent, here r_{k}, but the constraints are still assumed to be holonomic. As always the end points are fixed δr_{k}(t_{1}) = δr_{k}(t_{2}) = 0 for all k. What cannot be done is to simply equate the coefficients of δr_{k} to zero because the δr_{k} are not independent. Instead, the method of Lagrange multipliers can be used to include the constraints. Multiplying each constraint equation f_{i}(r_{k}, t) = 0 by a Lagrange multiplier λ_{i} for i = 1, 2, ..., C, and adding the results to the original Lagrangian, gives the new Lagrangian
$$L' = L(\mathbf{r}_1,\mathbf{r}_2,\ldots,\dot{\mathbf{r}}_1,\dot{\mathbf{r}}_2,\ldots,t) + \sum_{i=1}^C \lambda_i(t) f_i(\mathbf{r}_k,t).$$

The Lagrange multipliers are arbitrary functions of time t, but not functions of the coordinates r_{k}, so the multipliers are on equal footing with the position coordinates. Varying this new Lagrangian and integrating with respect to time gives
$$\int_{t_1}^{t_2} \delta L' \mathrm{d}t = \int_{t_1}^{t_2} \sum_{k=1}^N \left(\frac{\partial L}{\partial \mathbf{r}_k} - \frac{\mathrm{d}}{\mathrm{d}t}\frac{\partial L}{\partial \dot{\mathbf{r}}_k} + \sum_{i=1}^C \lambda_i \frac{\partial f_i }{\partial \mathbf{r}_k}\right)\cdot\delta \mathbf{r}_k \, \mathrm{d}t = 0.$$

The introduced multipliers can be found so that the coefficients of δr_{k} are zero, even though the r_{k} are not independent. The equations of motion follow. From the preceding analysis, obtaining the solution to this integral is equivalent to the statement
$$\frac{\partial L'}{\partial \mathbf{r}_k} - \frac{\mathrm{d}}{\mathrm{d}t}\frac{\partial L'}{\partial \dot{\mathbf{r}}_k} = 0 \quad \Rightarrow \quad \frac{\partial L}{\partial \mathbf{r}_k} - \frac{\mathrm{d}}{\mathrm{d}t}\frac{\partial L}{\partial \dot{\mathbf{r}}_k} + \sum_{i=1}^C \lambda_i \frac{\partial f_i }{\partial \mathbf{r}_k} = 0,$$
which are Lagrange's equations of the first kind. Also, the λ_{i} Euler–Lagrange equations for the new Lagrangian return the constraint equations
$$\frac{\partial L'}{\partial \lambda_i} - \frac{\mathrm{d}}{\mathrm{d}t}\frac{\partial L'}{\partial \dot{\lambda}_i}  = 0 \quad \Rightarrow \quad f_i(\mathbf{r}_k,t) = 0.$$

For the case of a conservative force given by the gradient of some potential energy V, a function of the r_{k} coordinates only, substituting the Lagrangian L = T − V gives
$$\underbrace{ \frac{\partial T}{\partial \mathbf{r}_k} - \frac{\mathrm{d}}{\mathrm{d}t}\frac{\partial T}{\partial \dot{\mathbf{r}}_k} }_{-\mathbf{F}_k} + \underbrace{ - \frac{\partial V}{\partial \mathbf{r}_k}}_{\mathbf{N}_k} + \sum_{i=1}^C \lambda_i \frac{\partial f_i}{\partial \mathbf{r}_k} = 0,$$
and identifying the derivatives of kinetic energy as the (negative of the) resultant force, and the derivatives of the potential equaling the non-constraint force, it follows the constraint forces are
$$\mathbf{C}_k = \sum_{i=1}^C \lambda_i \frac{\partial f_i}{\partial \mathbf{r}_k},$$
thus giving the constraint forces explicitly in terms of the constraint equations and the Lagrange multipliers.

== Properties of the Lagrangian ==
=== Non-uniqueness ===
The Lagrangian of a given system is not unique. A Lagrangian L can be multiplied by a nonzero constant a and shifted by an arbitrary constant b, and the new Lagrangian L′ = aL + b will describe the same motion as L. If one restricts as above to trajectories q over a given time interval [t_{st}, t_{fin}] and fixed end points P_{st} = q(t_{st}) and P_{fin} = q(t_{fin}), then two Lagrangians describing the same system can differ by the "total time derivative" of a function f(q, t):
$$L'(\mathbf{q},\dot\mathbf{q},t) = L(\mathbf{q},\dot\mathbf{q},t) + \frac{\mathrm{d}f(\mathbf{q},t)}{\mathrm{d}t},$$
where $\frac{\mathrm{d}f(\mathbf{q},t)}{\mathrm{d}t}$ means $\frac{\partial f(\mathbf{q},t)}{\partial t}+\sum_i \frac{\partial f(\mathbf{q},t)}{\partial q_i} {\dot q}_i.$

Both Lagrangians L and L′ produce the same equations of motion since the corresponding actions S and S′ are related via
$$\begin{align}
S'[\mathbf{q}] &= \int^{t_\text{fin}}_{t_\text{st}} L'(\mathbf{q}(t),\dot\mathbf{q}(t),t)\,dt \\
&= \int^{t_\text{fin}}_{t_\text{st}} L(\mathbf{q}(t),\dot\mathbf{q}(t),t)\,dt + \int^{t_\text{fin}}_{t_\text{st}} \frac{\mathrm{d}f(\mathbf{q}(t),t)}{\mathrm{d}t}\, dt \\
&=
S[\mathbf{q}] + f(P_\text{fin},t_\text{fin}) - f(P_\text{st},t_\text{st}),
\end{align}$$
with the last two components f(P_{fin}, t_{fin}) and f(P_{st}, t_{st}) independent of q.

=== Invariance under point transformations ===
Given a set of generalized coordinates q, if we change these variables to a new set of generalized coordinates Q according to a point transformation Q = Q(q, t) which is invertible as q = q(Q, t), the new Lagrangian L′ is a function of the new coordinates and similarly for the constraints
$$\begin{align}L'(\mathbf{Q}, \dot{\mathbf{Q}},t) &= L(\mathbf{q}(\mathbf{Q},t), \dot{\mathbf{q}}(\mathbf{Q},\dot{\mathbf{Q}},t), t ),\\
\phi_j'(\mathbf{Q},t)&=\phi_j(\mathbf{q}(\mathbf{Q},t),t)
\end{align}$$
and by the chain rule for partial differentiation, Lagrange's equations are invariant under this transformation;

$$\frac{\mathrm{d}}{\mathrm{d}t}\frac{\partial L'}{\partial \dot{Q}_i} = \frac{\partial L'}{\partial Q_i}+\sum_j\lambda_j\frac{\partial \phi'_j}{\partial Q_i}.$$

Proof
For a coordinate transformation $Q_i=Q_i(\mathbf q,t)$, we have
$$d{Q_i} =\sum_k\frac{\partial Q_i}{\partial q_k}d{q_k}+\frac{\partial Q_k}{\partial t} d t,$$
which implies that $\dot{Q_i} =\sum_k\frac{\partial Q_i}{\partial q_k}(\mathbf q,t)\,\dot q_k+\frac{\partial Q_k}{\partial t}(\mathbf q,t)$ which implies that $\frac{\partial \dot{Q_i}}{\partial \dot q_k}=\frac{\partial Q_i}{\partial q_k}$.

It also follows that:
$$\frac{\partial\dot{Q_i}}{\partial q_j} =\sum_k\frac{\partial^2 Q_i}{\partial q_j \partial q_k}(\mathbf q,t) \, \dot q_k+\frac{\partial^2 Q_k}{\partial q_j \partial t}(\mathbf q,t)$$
and similarly:
$$\frac{d}{dt} \left(\frac{\partial {Q_i}}{\partial q_j} \right)=\sum_k\frac{\partial^2 Q_i}{\partial q_k \partial q_j}(\mathbf q,t) \, \dot q_k+\frac{\partial^2 Q_k}{\partial t \partial q_j}(\mathbf q,t)$$
which imply that $\frac{d}{dt}\left(\frac{\partial Q_i}{\partial q_k}\right)= \frac{\partial \dot Q_i}{\partial q_k}$. The two derived relations can be employed in the proof.

Starting from Euler–Lagrange equations in initial set of generalized coordinates, we have:
$$\begin{align}
\frac{d}{d t}\frac{\partial L}{\partial\dot{q}_{i}}-\frac{{\partial}L}{\partial q_{i}}-\sum_j\lambda_j\frac{\partial \phi_j}{\partial q_i}=0\\
\sum_k\left( \frac{d}{d t}\left(\frac{\partial L}{\partial\dot{Q}_{k}}\frac{\partial \dot Q_k}{\partial\dot{q}_{i}}\right)-\frac{{\partial}L}{\partial Q_{k}}\frac{\partial  Q_k}{\partial{q}_{i}}-\frac{{\partial}L}{\partial \dot Q_{k}}\frac{\partial \dot Q_k}{\partial {q}_{i}}-\sum_j\lambda_j\frac{\partial \phi_j}{\partial Q_k}\frac{\partial Q_k}{\partial q_i}\right)=0\\
\sum_k\left( \frac{d}{d t}\left(\frac{\partial L}{\partial\dot{Q}_{k}}\right)\frac{\partial \dot Q_k}{\partial\dot{q}_{i}}+ \frac{\partial L}{\partial\dot{Q}_{k}}\frac{d}{d t}\left(\frac{\partial \dot Q_k}{\partial\dot{q}_{i}}\right)-\frac{{\partial}L}{\partial Q_{k}}\frac{\partial  \dot Q_k}{\partial \dot {q}_{i}}-\frac{{\partial}L}{\partial \dot Q_{k}}\frac{d}{dt}\left(\frac{\partial Q_k}{\partial q_i}\right) -\sum_j\lambda_j\frac{\partial \phi_j}{\partial Q_k}\frac{\partial Q_k}{\partial q_i}\right) = 0 \\
\sum_k \left(\frac{d}{d t}\left(\frac{\partial L}{\partial\dot{Q}_{k}}\right)-\frac{\partial L}{\partial Q_k}-\sum_j\lambda_j\frac{\partial \phi_j}{\partial Q_k}\right)\frac{\partial Q_k}{\partial q_i}=0\\
\end{align}$$

Since the transformation from $q\rightarrow Q$ is invertible, it follows that the form of the Euler–Lagrange equation is invariant i.e.,
$$\frac{d}{d t}\frac{\partial L}{\partial\dot{Q}_{i}}-\frac{{\partial}L}{\partial Q_{i}}-\sum_j\lambda_j\frac{\partial \phi_j}{\partial Q_i}=0.$$

=== Cyclic coordinates and conserved momenta ===
An important property of the Lagrangian is that conserved quantities can easily be read off from it. The generalized momentum "canonically conjugate to" the coordinate q_{i} is defined by
$$p_i =\frac{\partial L}{\partial\dot q_i}.$$

If the Lagrangian L does not depend on some coordinate q_{i}, it follows immediately from the Euler–Lagrange equations that
$$\dot{p}_i = \frac{\mathrm{d}}{\mathrm{d}t}\frac{\partial L}{\partial\dot q_i} = \frac{\partial L}{\partial q_i} = 0$$
and integrating shows the corresponding generalized momentum equals a constant, a conserved quantity. This is a special case of Noether's theorem. Such coordinates are called "cyclic" or "ignorable".

For example, a system may have a Lagrangian
$$L(r,\theta,\dot{s},\dot{z},\dot{r},\dot{\theta},\dot{\phi},t),$$
where r and z are lengths along straight lines, s is an arc length along some curve, and θ and φ are angles. Notice z, s, and φ are all absent in the Lagrangian even though their velocities are not. Then the momenta
$$p_z =\frac{\partial L}{\partial\dot z},\quad p_s =\frac{\partial L}{\partial \dot s},\quad p_\phi =\frac{\partial L}{\partial \dot \phi},$$
are all conserved quantities. The units and nature of each generalized momentum will depend on the corresponding coordinate; in this case p_{z} is a translational momentum in the z direction, p_{s} is also a translational momentum along the curve s is measured, and p_{φ} is an angular momentum in the plane the angle φ is measured in. However complicated the motion of the system is, all the coordinates and velocities will vary in such a way that these momenta are conserved.

=== Strict convexity of Lagrangian ===
Since an infinitesimal variation of path $\delta q$ can be made with arbitrary time parametrization, arbitrarily high variations in velocities can be achieved causing second order variation in action to be dominated by $\mathcal O(\delta \dot q)\gg \mathcal O(\delta q)$ imposing the following condition by action minimization principle:
$$\delta^2 S\geq 0\implies\frac{\partial^2 L}{\partial \dot q_i\partial \dot q_j}\delta \dot q_i\delta \dot q_j=(\delta q)^TW\delta q\geq 0$$
which is the positive (semi) definiteness of the Hessian matrix, $W_{ij}=\frac{\partial^2 L}{\partial \dot q_i\partial \dot q_j}$ which is equivalent to the Lagrangian, $L$, being a convex function of generalized velocities. Convexity of Lagrangian is of significance as it is also invariant under point transformations or modification of Lagrangian by total derivative terms. (Note: If Lagrangian is modified by a total derivative $L'=L+\frac{d\lambda}{dt}=L+\frac{\partial \lambda}{\partial q}\dot q+\frac{\partial \lambda}{\partial t}$, the two Lagrangians share same Hessian and hence also preserve the convexity criteria.) (Note: Under point transformations, wherein $Q=Q(q,t),\,\frac{\partial q}{\partial Q}=\frac{\partial \dot q}{\partial \dot Q}$, $$\frac{\partial^2 }{\partial \dot Q_r\partial \dot Q_s}=\frac{\partial q_\alpha}{\partial Q_r}\frac{\partial q_\beta}{\partial Q_s}\frac{\partial^2 }{\partial \dot q_\alpha\partial \dot q_\beta}$$ which ensures that convexity condition is invariant under point transformations. It additionally preserves systems having $\det(W)=0$ condition, which are systems of physical relevance known as singular Lagrangians.)

A strictly convex Lagrangian require the condition to be always greater than zero, i.e. have an invertible Hessian matrix which are called non-singular Lagrangian systems. Strict convexity also enables passage from Lagrangian formulation to a Hamiltonian formulation that uses Poisson bracket structure through a Legendre transformation, $L(q,\dot q,t)\rightarrow H(q,p=\frac{\partial L}{\partial\dot q},t)$ which is well defined on strictly convex functions. Lagrangian systems in Newtonian and special relativistic framework, with assumption of positive semi-definite Hessian of potential function, always have a strictly convex Lagrangian.

Proof
Assumption
- The potential function has a hessian, $K_{rs} =- \frac{\partial^2 V}{\partial \dot q^r\partial \dot q^s}$, with respect to generalized velocities that is either vanishing everywhere or positive (semi) definite everywhere. Note that this also applies to potentials that are linear in $\dot {\mathbf r}$ such as that of electromagnetic field $V= \sum q(\phi - \dot {\mathbf r}\cdot \mathbf A)$ since their hessian with respect to generalized velocities always vanish at every point.

Proof 1: Newtonian Mechanics

This follows from the expansion of the velocity vector in terms of generalized velocities, $\dot {\mathbf r}=\left (\frac {\partial \mathbf r}{\partial q^r}\dot q^r+\frac {\partial \mathbf r}{\partial t}\right)$.

Assuming the form of the Lagrangian to be $L=T-V= \sum \frac 1 2 m \dot {\mathbf r}^2-V$ and substituting the expression for velocity vector, the hessian can be calculated to be:
$$W_{rs} =\frac{\partial^2 L}{\partial \dot q^r\partial \dot q^s}=\sum m \frac{\partial \mathbf r}{\partial q^r}\cdot  \frac{\partial \mathbf r}{\partial q^s}+ K_{rs}=M_{rs}+K_{rs}$$
To show positive definiteness of the matrix, it is sufficient to show that $x^TMx=\sum m\left(\frac{\partial \mathbf r}{\partial q^s}x^s\right)^2> 0$ for any non zero $x^s$ which is enforced by the bijective nature of generalized coordinates representing the configuration. This can be shown explicitly by enforcing that for any change in the values of coordinates, $q^s \rightarrow q^s + \epsilon x^s$, the corresponding change $\delta \mathbf r = \epsilon \frac{\partial \mathbf r}{\partial q^s}x^s$ cannot be null vector for well-behaving generalized coordinates that are one-one representations which imposes non-zero magnitude square unless, $x = 0$. This property of generalized coordinates is called local invertibility in terms of physical configuration.

Hence it is also proved that $W$ is a positive definite matrix implying strict convexity of Lagrangian of the given form in generalized velocity.

Proof 2: Special Relativity

Taking the relativistic Lagrangian, $L=- \sum \frac{m_0c^2}{\gamma(\dot{\mathbf r})}-V$ and employing the same steps, the hessian of the Lagrangian is calculated to be:
$$W_{rs}=\frac{\partial L}{\partial \dot q^r \partial \dot q^s}=\sum {{\gamma (\dot{\mathbf r})}}\frac{\partial^2\left( \frac {m_0v^2}2\right)}{\partial \dot q^r \partial\dot q^s} +\sum \frac{m_0}{c^2} \gamma^3(\dot{\mathbf r})\frac{\partial\left( \frac {v^2}2\right)}{\partial\dot q^s} \frac{\partial \left( \frac {v^2}2\right)}{\partial \dot q^r }+K_{rs}=M'_{rs}+M_{rs}+K_{rs}$$
Since the first term is known to be positive definite, it is sufficient to show semi-positive definiteness of the second term which follows from:
$$x^TMx=\sum \frac{m_0}{c^2}\gamma^3(\dot{\mathbf r})\left(\frac{\partial \left( \frac {v^2}2\right)}{\partial \dot q^s } x^s \right)^2 \geq 0$$
Hence it is proved that $W$ is positive definite matrix implying strict convexity of Lagrangian of the given form in generalized velocity.

In general relativity however, $L=\sqrt{g_{\mu\nu}\dot x^\mu \dot x^\nu}\implies \partial_{\dot x^\mu}\partial_{\dot x^\nu}L=(g_{\mu\nu}\dot x\cdot\dot x-g_{\mu\alpha}g_{\nu\beta}\dot x^{\alpha}\dot x^\beta)L^{-3}$ which has null eigenvector $\dot x^\nu$.

=== Energy ===
Given a Lagrangian $L,$ the Hamiltonian of the corresponding mechanical system is, by definition,
$$H = \biggl(\sum^n_{i=1} {\dot{q}}_i\frac{\partial L}{\partial \dot{q}_i}\biggr) - L.$$
This quantity will be equivalent to energy if the generalized coordinates are natural coordinates, i.e., they have no explicit time dependence when expressing position vector: $\mathbf{r}= \mathbf{r}(q_1, \cdots, q_n)$. From:
$$T = \frac{m}{2}v^2 = \frac{m}{2} \sum_{i,j} \left(\frac{\partial \vec{r}}{\partial q_i} \dot{q}_i       \right)\cdot \left(\frac{\partial \vec{r}}{\partial q_j} \dot{q}_j\right) = \frac{m}{2} \sum_{i,j} a_{ij} \dot{q}_i\dot{q}_j$$
$$\sum^n_{k=1} \dot{q}_k \frac{\partial L}{\partial \dot{q}_k} = \sum^n_{k=1} \dot{q}_k \frac{\partial T}{\partial \dot{q}_k} = \frac{m}{2}\left( 2 \sum_{i,j} a_{ij} \dot{q}_i\dot{q}_j\right) = 2T$$
$$H = \left(\sum^n_{i=1} {\dot{q}}_i\frac{\partial L}{\partial \dot{q}_i}\right) - L = 2T - (T - V) = T + V = E$$
where $a_{ij}=\frac{\partial\mathbf r}{\partial q_i}\cdot \frac{\partial\mathbf r}{\partial q_j}$ is a symmetric matrix that is defined for the derivation.

==== Invariance under coordinate transformations ====
At every time instant t, the energy is invariant under configuration space coordinate changes q → Q(q), i.e. (using natural coordinates)
$$E(\mathbf{q},\dot\mathbf{q},t) = E(\mathbf{Q},\dot\mathbf{Q},t).$$
Besides this result, the proof below shows that, under such change of coordinates, the derivatives $\partial L/\partial {\dot q}_i$ change as coefficients of a linear form.

Proof
Under time independent point transformations, wherein
$$\mathbf Q=\mathbf Q(\mathbf q),\implies \dot Q_i(\mathbf q,\mathbf {\dot q})= \frac{\partial Q_i}{\partial q_j}(\mathbf q)\,\,\dot q_j,\quad \frac{\partial \dot Q_i}{\partial \dot q_j}=\frac{\partial Q_i}{\partial q_j},$$
followed by similar relations by inverting the transformation,
$$\mathbf q=\mathbf q(\mathbf Q),\implies \frac{\partial q_i}{\partial\dot Q_j}=0,\quad \dot q_i(\mathbf Q,\mathbf {\dot Q})=\frac{\partial q_i}{\partial Q_j}(\mathbf Q)\,\,\dot Q_j.$$

Using $L(\mathbf Q,\mathbf {\dot Q},t)=L(\mathbf q(\mathbf Q),\mathbf {\dot q}(\mathbf Q,\mathbf {\dot Q}),t)$ and above relations,

$$\begin{align}\sum_i\dot Q_i \frac{\partial L}{\partial\dot{Q}_i} =\sum_{i,j}\dot Q_i\left(\frac{\partial L}{\partial q_j}\cancelto0{\frac{\partial q_j}{\partial \dot Q_i}}+\frac{\partial L}{\partial \dot q_j}\frac{\partial \dot q_j}{\partial \dot Q_i}\right)= \sum_i\frac {\partial L}{\partial q_j} \left(\dot Q_i\frac{\partial q_j}{\partial Q_i}\right)=\sum_i\dot {q_i}\frac{\partial L}{\partial\dot{q_i}}.\end{align}$$

The invariance of the energy on time-independent generalized coordinates is shown:
$$\biggl(\sum^n_{i=1} {\dot{q}}_i\frac{\partial L}{\partial \dot{q}_i}\biggr) - L= \biggl(\sum^n_{i=1}{\dot{Q}}_i\frac{\partial L}{\partial \dot{Q}_i}\biggr) - L=E.$$

==== Conservation ====
In Lagrangian mechanics, the system is closed if and only if its Lagrangian $L$ does not explicitly depend on time. The energy conservation law states that the energy $E$ of a closed system is an integral of motion.

More precisely, let q = q(t) be an extremal. (In other words, q satisfies the Euler–Lagrange equations). Taking the total time-derivative of L along this extremal and using the EL equations leads to
$$\begin{align}
\frac{dL}{dt} &=\sum_i\left( \dot{q}_i \frac{\partial L}{\partial  q_i}+\ddot{q}_i \frac{\partial L}{\partial \dot q_i} + \frac{\partial L}{\partial t} \right), \quad \frac{\mathrm{d}}{\mathrm{d}t}\left(\frac{\partial L}{\partial\dot q_i}\right) - \frac{\partial L}{\partial q_i} =0\\
&\implies- \frac{\partial L}{\partial t} = \sum_i\left(\dot{q}_i\frac{d}{dt}\left(\frac{\partial L}{\partial \dot q_i}\right)+\frac{d\dot q_i}{dt} \frac{\partial L}{\partial \dot q_i} - \dot{L}\right) = \frac{d}{dt}\left(\sum_i \frac{\partial L}{\partial \dot q_i} \dot q_i  - L \right)= \frac{dH}{dt}\\
\end{align}$$

If the Lagrangian L does not explicitly depend on time, then ∂L/∂t = 0, then H does not vary with time evolution of particle, indeed, an integral of motion, meaning that
$$H(\mathbf{q}(t), \dot\mathbf{q}(t), t) = \text{constant of time}.$$
Hence, if the chosen coordinates were natural coordinates, the energy is conserved.

==== Kinetic and potential energies ====
Under all these circumstances, the constant
$$E = T + V$$
is the total energy of the system. The kinetic and potential energies still change as the system evolves, but the motion of the system will be such that their sum, the total energy, is constant. This is a valuable simplification, since the energy E is a constant of integration that counts as an arbitrary constant for the problem, and it may be possible to integrate the velocities from this energy relation to solve for the coordinates.

=== Mechanical similarity ===
If the potential energy is a homogeneous function of the coordinates and independent of time, and all position vectors are scaled by the same nonzero constant α, r_{k}′ = αr_{k}, so that
$$V(\alpha\mathbf{r}_1,\alpha\mathbf{r}_2,\ldots, \alpha\mathbf{r}_N)=\alpha^N V(\mathbf{r}_1,\mathbf{r}_2,\ldots, \mathbf{r}_N)$$
and time is scaled by a factor β, t′ = βt, then the velocities v_{k} are scaled by a factor of α/β and the kinetic energy T by (α/β)^{2}. The entire Lagrangian has been scaled by the same factor if
$$\frac{\alpha^2}{\beta^2}=\alpha^N \quad\Rightarrow\quad \beta = \alpha^{1-\frac{N}{2}}.$$

Since the lengths and times have been scaled, the trajectories of the particles in the system follow geometrically similar paths differing in size. The length l traversed in time t in the original trajectory corresponds to a new length l′ traversed in time t′ in the new trajectory, given by the ratios
$$\frac{t'}{t}= \left(\frac{l'}{l}\right)^{1-\frac{N}{2}}.$$

=== Interacting particles ===
For a given system, if two subsystems A and B are non-interacting, the Lagrangian L of the overall system is the sum of the Lagrangians L_{A} and L_{B} for the subsystems:
$$L = L_A + L_B.$$

If they do interact this is not possible. In some situations, it may be possible to separate the Lagrangian of the system L into the sum of non-interacting Lagrangians, plus another Lagrangian L_{AB} containing information about the interaction,
$$L = L_A + L_B + L_{AB}.$$

This may be physically motivated by taking the non-interacting Lagrangians to be kinetic energies only, while the interaction Lagrangian is the system's total potential energy. Also, in the limiting case of negligible interaction, L_{AB} tends to zero reducing to the non-interacting case above.

The extension to more than two non-interacting subsystems is straightforward – the overall Lagrangian is the sum of the separate Lagrangians for each subsystem. If there are interactions, then interaction Lagrangians may be added.

=== Singular Lagrangians ===
Due to invariance of the non-singularity of the Hessian matrix, $W_{ij}=\frac{\partial^2 L}{\partial \dot q_i\partial \dot q_j}$, over coordinate transformations and modification of Lagrangian by total derivatives, such cases are physically relevant and are called singular Lagrangians. Since canonical transformations in Hamiltonian dynamics are a greater set of transformations than the corresponding point transformations, singularity of Hamiltonians is not generally invariant under it. The Jacobian of the transformation, $(\mathbf q,\mathbf {\dot q}, t)\rightarrow (\mathbf q,\mathbf p,t)$, is also the singular Hessian matrix, $W_{ij}$. If rank of the hessian is constant, the non-invertibility of transformation to phase space is expressed as only a sub-manifold of the phase space that is characterized by constraint equations, as corresponding to physical states and their dynamics, due to which it is also sometimes termed as constrained dynamics.

From the Euler–Lagrange equations, it follows that:
$$\begin{align}
&\frac{d}{d t}\frac{\partial L}{\partial\dot{q}_{i}}-\frac{\partial L} {\partial q_{i}}=0\implies\sum_{j}W_{i j}(\mathbf q,\mathbf {\dot{q}},t)\ddot{q}_{j}={\frac{\partial L}{\partial q_{i}}}-\frac{\partial L}{\partial t}-\sum_{j}{\frac{\partial^{2}L}{\partial\dot{q}_{i}\partial q_{j}}}\dot{q}_{j},\\
\end{align}$$
where non-singularity of the Hessian, $W$, allows the above equations to solve all generalized accelerations as functions of $(\mathbf q,\mathbf {\dot q}, t)$. Hence, non-singularity of the Lagrangian is to be expected when not all $\mathbf{\ddot q}$ can be solved in terms of $(\mathbf q,\mathbf {\dot q}, t)$ or if first order derivatives are the highest order derivative in some combinations of the equations of motions. For example, these are encountered in classical field theory Lagrangians of Schrodinger's equation and Dirac equation whose equation of motion are first order in time derivative, and of classical electromagnetic theory since $\partial_t^2 A^0$ is absent in Maxwell's equations.

Under certain assumptions, it is possible to obtain a consistent Hamiltonian formulation, but with a modified form of the transformation generating Lie brackets, such as Dirac bracket for theories whose rank of the Hessian matrix remains constant. Thus canonical quantization makes use of preservation of the corresponding Lie algebra structure (upto an overall central charge) to derive an appropriate quantum representations which, for constrained systems results in canonical relations that differ from that expected from Poisson brackets.

== Examples ==
The following examples apply Lagrange's equations of the second kind to mechanical problems.

=== Conservative force ===
A particle of mass m moves under the influence of a conservative force derived from the gradient ∇ of a scalar potential,
$$\mathbf{F} = -\boldsymbol{\nabla} V(\mathbf{r}).$$

If there are more particles, in accordance with the above results, the total kinetic energy is a sum over all the particle kinetic energies, and the potential is a function of all the coordinates.

==== Cartesian coordinates ====
The Lagrangian of the particle can be written
$$L(x,y,z, \dot{x}, \dot{y},\dot{z}) = \frac{1}{2} m (\dot{x}^2 + \dot{y}^2 + \dot{z}^2) - V(x,y,z).$$

The equations of motion for the particle are found by applying the Euler–Lagrange equation, for the x coordinate
$$\frac{\mathrm{d}}{\mathrm{d}t} \left( \frac{\partial L}{\partial \dot{x}} \right) = \frac{\partial L}{\partial x},$$
with derivatives
$$\frac{\partial L}{\partial x} = - \frac{\partial V}{\partial x},\quad \frac{\partial L}{\partial \dot{x}}  = m \dot{x},\quad \frac{\mathrm{d}}{\mathrm{d}t} \left( \frac{\partial L}{\partial \dot{x}} \right) = m \ddot{x},$$
hence
$$m \ddot{x} = - \frac{\partial V}{\partial x},$$
and similarly for the y and z coordinates. Collecting the equations in vector form we find
$$m\ddot{\mathbf{r}}=-\boldsymbol{\nabla} V$$
which is Newton's second law of motion for a particle subject to a conservative force.

==== Polar coordinates in 2D and 3D ====
Using the spherical coordinates (r, θ, φ) as commonly used in physics (ISO 80000-2:2019 convention), where r is the radial distance to origin, θ is polar angle (also known as colatitude, zenith angle, normal angle, or inclination angle), and φ is the azimuthal angle, the Lagrangian for a central potential is
$$L = \frac{m}{2}(\dot{r}^2+r^2\dot{\theta}^2 +r^2\sin^2\theta \, \dot{\varphi}^2)-V(r).$$
So, in spherical coordinates, the Euler–Lagrange equations are
$$m\ddot{r}-mr(\dot{\theta}^2+\sin^2\theta \, \dot{\varphi}^2)+\frac{\partial V}{\partial r} =0,$$
$$\frac{\mathrm{d}}{\mathrm{d}t}(mr^2\dot{\theta}) -mr^2\sin\theta\cos\theta \, \dot{\varphi}^2=0,$$
$$\frac{\mathrm{d}}{\mathrm{d}t}(mr^2\sin^2\theta \, \dot{\varphi})=0.$$
The φ coordinate is cyclic since it does not appear in the Lagrangian, so the conserved momentum in the system is the angular momentum
$$p_\varphi = \frac{\partial L}{\partial \dot{\varphi}} = mr^2\sin^2\theta \dot{\varphi},$$
in which r, θ and dφ/dt can all vary with time, but only in such a way that p_{φ} is constant.

The Lagrangian in two-dimensional polar coordinates is recovered by fixing θ to the constant value π/2.

=== Pendulum on a movable support ===
Sketch of the situation with definition of the coordinates (click to enlarge)

Consider a pendulum of mass m and length ℓ, which is attached to a support with mass M, which can move along a line in the $x$-direction. Let $x$ be the coordinate along the line of the support, and let us denote the position of the pendulum by the angle $\theta$ from the vertical. The coordinates and velocity components of the pendulum bob are
$$\begin{array}{rll}
& x_\mathrm{pend} = x + \ell \sin \theta & \quad \Rightarrow \quad \dot{x}_\mathrm{pend} = \dot{x} + \ell \dot{\theta} \cos \theta \\
& y_\mathrm{pend} = - \ell \cos\theta & \quad \Rightarrow \quad \dot{y}_\mathrm{pend} = \ell \dot{\theta} \sin \theta.
\end{array}$$

The generalized coordinates can be taken to be $x$ and $\theta$. The kinetic energy of the system is then
$$T = \frac{1}{2} M \dot{x}^2 + \frac{1}{2} m \left( \dot{x}_\mathrm{pend}^2 + \dot{y}_\mathrm{pend}^2 \right)$$
and the potential energy is
$$V = m g y_\mathrm{pend}$$
giving the Lagrangian
$$\begin{array}{rcl}
L &=& T - V \\
&=& \frac{1}{2} M \dot{x}^2 + \frac{1}{2} m \left[ \left( \dot x + \ell \dot\theta \cos \theta \right)^2 + \left( \ell \dot\theta \sin \theta \right)^2 \right] + m g \ell \cos \theta \\
&=& \frac{1}{2} \left(  M + m \right) \dot x^2 + m \dot x \ell \dot \theta \cos \theta + \frac{1}{2} m \ell^2 \dot \theta ^2 + m g \ell \cos \theta.
\end{array}$$

Since x is absent from the Lagrangian, it is a cyclic coordinate. The conserved momentum is
$$p_x = \frac{\partial L }{\partial \dot{x}} = (M + m) \dot x + m \ell \dot\theta \cos\theta,$$
and the Lagrange equation for the support coordinate $x$ is
$$(M + m) \ddot x + m \ell \ddot\theta\cos\theta-m \ell \dot\theta ^2 \sin\theta = 0.$$

The Lagrange equation for the angle θ is
$$\frac{\mathrm{d}}{\mathrm{d}t}\left[ m( \dot x \ell \cos\theta + \ell^2 \dot\theta ) \right] + m \ell (\dot x \dot \theta + g) \sin\theta = 0;$$
and simplifying
$$\ddot\theta + \frac{\ddot x}{\ell} \cos\theta + \frac{g}{\ell} \sin\theta = 0.$$

These equations may look quite complicated, but finding them with Newton's laws would have required carefully identifying all forces, which would have been much more laborious and prone to errors. By considering limit cases, the correctness of this system can be verified: For example, $\ddot x \to 0$ should give the equations of motion for a simple pendulum that is at rest in some inertial frame, while $\ddot\theta \to 0$ should give the equations for a pendulum in a constantly accelerating system, etc. Furthermore, it is trivial to obtain the results numerically, given suitable starting conditions and a chosen time step, by stepping through the results iteratively.

=== Two-body central force problem ===
Two bodies of masses m_{1} and m_{2} with position vectors r_{1} and r_{2} are in orbit about each other due to an attractive central potential V. We may write down the Lagrangian in terms of the position coordinates as they are, but it is an established procedure to convert the two-body problem into a one-body problem as follows. Introduce the Jacobi coordinates; the separation of the bodies r = r_{2} − r_{1} and the location of the center of mass R = (m_{1}r_{1} + m_{2}r_{2})/(m_{1} + m_{2}). The Lagrangian is then (Note: The Lagrangian also can be written explicitly for a rotating frame. See Padmanabhan, 2000.)
$$L = \underbrace{\frac {1}{2} M \dot{\mathbf{R}}^2}_{L_{\text{cm}}} + \underbrace{\frac {1}{2} \mu \dot{\mathbf{r}}^2 - V(|\mathbf{r}|) }_{L_{\text{rel}}}$$
where M = m_{1} + m_{2} is the total mass, μ = m_{1}m_{2}/(m_{1} + m_{2}) is the reduced mass, and V the potential of the radial force, which depends only on the magnitude of the separation |r| = |r_{2} − r_{1}|. The Lagrangian splits into a center-of-mass term L_{cm} and a relative motion term L_{rel}.

The Euler–Lagrange equation for R is simply
$$M\ddot{\mathbf{R}} = 0,$$
which states the center of mass moves in a straight line at constant velocity.

Since the relative motion only depends on the magnitude of the separation, it is ideal to use polar coordinates (r, θ) and take r = |r|,
$$L_\text{rel} = \frac{1}{2} \mu \left(\dot{r}^2 +r^2 \dot{\theta}^2 \right) - V(r),$$
so θ is a cyclic coordinate with the corresponding conserved (angular) momentum
$$p_\theta = \frac {\partial L_\text{rel}}{\partial \dot \theta} = \mu r^2 \dot \theta = \ell.$$

The radial coordinate r and angular velocity dθ/dt can vary with time, but only in such a way that ℓ is constant. The Lagrange equation for r is
$$\mu r \dot \theta ^2 -\frac {dV}{dr} = \mu \ddot{r}.$$

This equation is identical to the radial equation obtained using Newton's laws in a co-rotating reference frame, that is, a frame rotating with the reduced mass so it appears stationary. Eliminating the angular velocity dθ/dt from this radial equation,
$$\mu \ddot r = -\frac{\mathrm{d}V}{\mathrm{d}r} + \frac{\ell^2}{\mu r^3}.$$
which is the equation of motion for a one-dimensional problem in which a particle of mass μ is subjected to the inward central force −dV/dr and a second outward force, called in this context the (Lagrangian) centrifugal force (see centrifugal force#Other uses of the term):
$$F_{\mathrm{cf}} = \mu r \dot \theta ^2 = \frac {\ell^2}{\mu r^3}.$$

Of course, if one remains entirely within the one-dimensional formulation, ℓ enters only as some imposed parameter of the external outward force, and its interpretation as angular momentum depends upon the more general two-dimensional problem from which the one-dimensional problem originated.

If one arrives at this equation using Newtonian mechanics in a co-rotating frame, the interpretation is evident as the centrifugal force in that frame due to the rotation of the frame itself. If one arrives at this equation directly by using the generalized coordinates (r, θ) and simply following the Lagrangian formulation without thinking about frames at all, the interpretation is that the centrifugal force is an outgrowth of using polar coordinates. As Hildebrand says:

"Since such quantities are not true physical forces, they are often called inertia forces. Their presence or absence depends, not upon the particular problem at hand, but upon the coordinate system chosen." In particular, if Cartesian coordinates are chosen, the centrifugal force disappears, and the formulation involves only the central force itself, which provides the centripetal force for a curved motion.

This viewpoint, that fictitious forces originate in the choice of coordinates, often is expressed by users of the Lagrangian method. This view arises naturally in the Lagrangian approach, because the frame of reference is (possibly unconsciously) selected by the choice of coordinates. For example, see for a comparison of Lagrangians in an inertial and in a noninertial frame of reference. See also the discussion of "total" and "updated" Lagrangian formulations in. Unfortunately, this usage of "inertial force" conflicts with the Newtonian idea of an inertial force. In the Newtonian view, an inertial force originates in the acceleration of the frame of observation (the fact that it is not an inertial frame of reference), not in the choice of coordinate system. To keep matters clear, it is safest to refer to the Lagrangian inertial forces as generalized inertial forces, to distinguish them from the Newtonian vector inertial forces. That is, one should avoid following Hildebrand when he says (p. 155) "we deal always with generalized forces, velocities accelerations, and momenta. For brevity, the adjective "generalized" will be omitted frequently."

It is known that the Lagrangian of a system is not unique. Within the Lagrangian formalism the Newtonian fictitious forces can be identified by the existence of alternative Lagrangians in which the fictitious forces disappear, sometimes found by exploiting the symmetry of the system.

== Extensions to include non-conservative forces ==
=== Dissipative forces ===
Dissipation (i.e. non-conservative systems) can also be treated with an effective Lagrangian formulated by a certain doubling of the degrees of freedom.

In a more general formulation, the forces could be both conservative and viscous. If an appropriate transformation can be found from the F_{i}, Rayleigh suggests using a dissipation function, D, of the following form:
$$D = \frac {1}{2} \sum_{j=1}^m \sum_{k=1}^m C_{j k} \dot{q}_j \dot{q}_k,$$
where C_{jk} are constants that are related to the damping coefficients in the physical system, though not necessarily equal to them. If D is defined this way, then
$$Q_j = - \frac {\partial V}{\partial q_j} - \frac {\partial D}{\partial \dot{q}_j}$$
and
$$\frac{\mathrm{d}}{\mathrm{d}t} \left ( \frac {\partial L}{\partial \dot{q}_j} \right ) - \frac {\partial L}{\partial q_j} + \frac {\partial D}{\partial \dot{q}_j} = 0.$$

=== Electromagnetism ===
A test particle is a particle whose mass and charge are assumed to be so small that its effect on external system is insignificant. It is often a hypothetical simplified point particle with no properties other than mass and charge. Real particles like electrons and up quarks are more complex and have additional terms in their Lagrangians. Not only can the fields form non conservative potentials, these potentials can also be velocity dependent.

The Lagrangian for a charged particle with electrical charge q, interacting with an electromagnetic field, is the prototypical example of a velocity-dependent potential. The electric scalar potential ϕ = ϕ(r, t) and magnetic vector potential A = A(r, t) are defined from the electric field E = E(r, t) and magnetic field B = B(r, t) as follows:
$$\mathbf{E} = - \boldsymbol{\nabla}\phi - \frac{\partial \mathbf{A}}{\partial t}, \quad \mathbf{B} = \boldsymbol{\nabla} \times \mathbf{A}.$$

The Lagrangian of a massive charged test particle in an electromagnetic field
$$L = \tfrac{1}{2}m \dot{\mathbf{r}}^2 + q\, \dot{\mathbf{r}} \cdot \mathbf{A} - q \phi,$$
is called minimal coupling. This is a good example of when the common rule of thumb that the Lagrangian is the kinetic energy minus the potential energy is incorrect. Combined with Euler–Lagrange equation, it produces the Lorentz force law
$$m \ddot{\mathbf{r}} = q \mathbf{E} + q \dot{\mathbf{r}} \times \mathbf{B}$$

Under gauge transformation:
$$\mathbf{A} \rightarrow \mathbf{A}+\boldsymbol{\nabla} f, \quad \phi \rightarrow \phi-\dot f,$$
where f(r,t) is any scalar function of space and time, the aforementioned Lagrangian transforms like:
$$L \rightarrow L+q\left(\dot{\mathbf{r}}\cdot\boldsymbol{\nabla}+\frac{\partial}{\partial t}\right)f=L+q\frac{df}{dt},$$
which still produces the same Lorentz force law.

Note that the canonical momentum (conjugate to position r) is the kinetic momentum plus a contribution from the A field (known as the potential momentum):
$$\mathbf{p} = \frac{\partial L}{\partial \dot{\mathbf{r}}} = m \dot{\mathbf{r}} + q \mathbf{A}.$$

This relation is also used in the minimal coupling prescription in quantum mechanics and quantum field theory. From this expression, we can see that the canonical momentum p is not gauge invariant, and therefore not a measurable physical quantity; However, if r is cyclic (i.e. Lagrangian is independent of position r), which happens if the ϕ and A fields are uniform, then this canonical momentum p given here is the conserved momentum, while the measurable physical kinetic momentum mv is not.

== Other contexts and formulations ==
The ideas in Lagrangian mechanics have numerous applications in other areas of physics, and can adopt generalized results from the calculus of variations.

=== Alternative formulations of classical mechanics ===
A closely related formulation of classical mechanics is Hamiltonian mechanics. The Hamiltonian is defined by
$$H = \sum_{i=1}^n \dot{q}_i\frac{\partial L}{\partial \dot{q}_i} - L$$
and can be obtained by performing a Legendre transformation on the Lagrangian, which introduces new variables canonically conjugate to the original variables. For example, given a set of generalized coordinates, the variables canonically conjugate are the generalized momenta. This doubles the number of variables, but makes differential equations first order. The Hamiltonian is a particularly ubiquitous quantity in quantum mechanics (see Hamiltonian (quantum mechanics)).

Routhian mechanics is a hybrid formulation of Lagrangian and Hamiltonian mechanics, which is not often used in practice but an efficient formulation for cyclic coordinates.

=== Momentum space formulation ===
The Euler–Lagrange equations can also be formulated in terms of the generalized momenta rather than generalized coordinates. Performing a Legendre transformation on the generalized coordinate Lagrangian L(q, dq/dt, t) obtains the generalized momenta Lagrangian L′(p, dp/dt, t) in terms of the original Lagrangian, as well the EL equations in terms of the generalized momenta. Both Lagrangians contain the same information, and either can be used to solve for the motion of the system. In practice generalized coordinates are more convenient to use and interpret than generalized momenta.

=== Alternative Lagrangians ===
Since Lagrangians that differ by a total time derivative term $\frac{d f(x,t)}{dt}$ produce the same equations of motion, it is possible to write the traditional one-dimensional Lagrangian, $L = T-U,$ in the equivalent form

$$L_a = \left( \sqrt{T} \pm i \sqrt{U} \right)^2$$

where it is assumed that, everywhere between the fixed endpoints, the kinetic energy is of the form $T = a(x)\dot{x}^2 \geq 0$ and $U(x) \geq 0$. For a kinetic energy $T = m\dot{x}^2/2 \geq 0$, the resulting equation of motion is

$$\sqrt{\frac{m}{2}} \dot{x} \pm i\sqrt{U}  =  A \exp \left[ \pm i \sqrt{\frac{2}{m}}  \int \frac{\partial \sqrt{U}}{\partial x}dt\right]$$

This equation provides a phasor picture of the energy of the system. The phasor has a magnitude equal to the square root of the total energy, and it rotates between the $\sqrt{\frac{m}{2}}\dot{x}$ and $\sqrt{U}$ axes at an angle $\sqrt{\frac{2}{m}} \int \frac{\partial \sqrt{U}}{\partial x}dt$. Thus the transfer of energy from potential to kinetic is conveyed by rotations of the phasor.

=== Alternative Actions ===
It is possible to show, using Lagrange multiplier techniques and other techniques, that many alternative actions may be used to produce the same equations of motion as the traditional action. These alternative actions are typically formulated with the assumption that time averaged values of the total energy are fixed. It is also possible to assume that time-averaged values of the kinetic or potential energies are fixed. For example, consider the actions

$$S_T =\int  T  \,dt  + \lambda_T \left[ \int \left( T + U\right) \,dt  - \bar{E}\Delta t\right],$$

and

$$S_U = \int U \,dt  + \lambda_U \left[ \int \left( T + U\right) \,dt  - \bar{E}\Delta t\right].$$

The terms in the square brackets represent the constraint that the time-averaged value of $T+U$ over the interval $\Delta t$ must be $\bar{E}$. Both actions produce the same equations of motion as each other and as the traditional action for $\lambda_T = -1/2$ and $\lambda_U = -1/2$, which are also the values for which the total energy $T+U$ is at all times equal to the time-averaged energy $\bar{E}$.

One interesting feature of $S_T$ is that its extremal value is a minimum value in the typical case where $T = \frac{1}{2} m \dot{x}^2$. This is true since the square bracketed constraint term in the action is, by definition, constant, and the second variation of the action will have the form $\delta^2 S_T = \int m \dot{\eta}^2\, dt$, where $\eta$ is the variation of the path. Clearly $\delta^2 S_T \geq 0$ for any $\eta$, so the extremal value must be a minimum.

Additionally, one might consider actions consisting of products of time-integrals of energy. For example and product action with a constraint on the time-averaged energy

$$S_P = \left[\int  T  \,dt \right]\left[\int  U  \,dt \right] + \lambda_P \left[ \int \left( T + U\right) \,dt  - \bar{E}\Delta t\right]$$

will produce the same equations of motion as the traditional action, for the appropriate choice of $\lambda_P$. It is also possible to produce the traditional equations of motion for powers of products of time-integrated energies, such as

$$S_{nm} = \left[\int  T  \,dt \right]^n \left[\int  U  \,dt \right]^m + \lambda_{nm} \left[ \int \left( T + U\right) \,dt  - \bar{E}\Delta t\right]$$

so long as the appropriate value of $\lambda_{nm}$ is chosen.

=== Higher derivatives of generalized coordinates ===
There is no mathematical reason to restrict the derivatives of generalized coordinates to first order only. It is possible to derive modified EL equations for a Lagrangian containing higher order derivatives, see Euler–Lagrange equation for details. However, from the physical point-of-view there is an obstacle to include time derivatives higher than the first order, which is implied by Ostrogradsky's construction of a canonical formalism for nondegenerate higher derivative Lagrangians, see Ostrogradsky instability

=== Optics ===
Lagrangian mechanics can be applied to geometrical optics, by applying variational principles to rays of light in a medium, and solving the EL equations gives the equations of the paths the light rays follow.

=== Relativistic formulation ===
Lagrangian mechanics can be formulated in special relativity and general relativity. Some features of Lagrangian mechanics are retained in the relativistic theories but difficulties quickly appear in other respects. In particular, the EL equations take the same form, and the connection between cyclic coordinates and conserved momenta still applies, however the Lagrangian must be modified and is not simply the kinetic minus the potential energy of a particle. Also, it is not straightforward to handle multiparticle systems in a manifestly covariant way, it may be possible if a particular frame of reference is singled out.

=== Quantum mechanics ===
In quantum mechanics, action and quantum-mechanical phase are related via the Planck constant, and the principle of stationary action can be understood in terms of constructive interference of wave functions.

In 1948, Feynman discovered the path integral formulation extending the principle of least action to quantum mechanics for electrons and photons. In this formulation, particles travel every possible path between the initial and final states; the probability of a specific final state is obtained by summing over all possible trajectories leading to it. In the classical regime, the path integral formulation cleanly reproduces Hamilton's principle, and Fermat's principle in optics.

=== Classical field theory ===
In Lagrangian mechanics, the generalized coordinates form a discrete set of variables that define the configuration of a system. In classical field theory, the physical system is not a set of discrete particles, but rather a continuous field ϕ(r, t) defined over a region of 3D space. Associated with the field is a Lagrangian density
$$\mathcal{L}(\phi, \nabla \phi, \dot\phi, \mathbf{r},t)$$
defined in terms of the field and its space and time derivatives at a location r and time t. Analogous to the particle case, for non-relativistic applications the Lagrangian density is also the kinetic energy density of the field, minus its potential energy density (this is not true in general, and the Lagrangian density has to be "reverse engineered"). The Lagrangian is then the volume integral of the Lagrangian density over 3D space
$$L(t) = \int  \mathcal{L} \, \mathrm{d}^3 \mathbf{r}$$
where d^{3}r is a 3D differential volume element. The Lagrangian is a function of time since the Lagrangian density has implicit space dependence via the fields, and may have explicit spatial dependence, but these are removed in the integral, leaving only time in as the variable for the Lagrangian.

=== Noether's theorem ===
The action principle, and the Lagrangian formalism, are tied closely to Noether's theorem, which connects physical conserved quantities to continuous symmetries of a physical system.

If the Lagrangian is invariant under a symmetry, then the resulting equations of motion are also invariant under that symmetry. This characteristic is very helpful in showing that theories are consistent with either special relativity or general relativity.

== See also ==
- Canonical coordinates
- Fundamental lemma of the calculus of variations
- Functional derivative
- Generalized coordinates
- Hamiltonian mechanics
- Hamiltonian optics
- Inverse problem for Lagrangian mechanics, the general topic of finding a Lagrangian for a system given the equations of motion.
- Lagrangian and Eulerian specification of the flow field
- Lagrangian point
- Lagrangian system
- Non-autonomous mechanics
- Plateau's problem
- Restricted three-body problem
