= Diagnostic equation =

In a physical (and especially geophysical) simulation context, a diagnostic equation (or diagnostic model) is an equation (or model) that links the values of these variables simultaneously, either because the equation (or model) is time-independent, or because the variables all refer to the values they have at the identical time. This is by opposition to a prognostic equation.

For instance, the so-called ideal gas law (PV = nRT) of classical thermodynamics relates the state variables of that gas, all estimated at the same time. It is understood that the values of any one of these variables can change in time, but the relation between these variables will remain valid at each and every particular instant, which implies that one variable cannot change its value without the value of another variable also being affected.
