= Rayleigh dissipation function =

Function used in Lagrangian mechanics

In physics, the Rayleigh dissipation function, named after Lord Rayleigh, is a function used to handle the effects of velocity-proportional frictional forces in Lagrangian mechanics. It was first introduced by him in 1873. If the frictional force on a particle with velocity $\vec{v}$ can be written as $\vec{F}_f = -k\vec{v}$, where $k$ is a diagonal matrix, then the Rayleigh dissipation function can be defined for a system of $N$ particles as

$$R(v) = \frac{1}{2} \sum_{i=1}^N ( k_x v_{i,x}^2 + k_y v_{i,y}^2 + k_z v_{i,z}^2 ).$$

This function represents half of the rate of energy dissipation of the system through friction. The force of friction is negative the velocity gradient of the dissipation function, $\vec{F}_f = -\nabla_v R(v)$, analogous to a force being equal to the negative position gradient of a potential. This relationship is represented in terms of the set of generalized coordinates $q_{i}=\left\{q_{1},q_{2},\ldots q_{n}\right\}$ as

$$F_{f,i} = -\frac{\partial R}{\partial\dot{q}_{i}}$$.

As friction is not conservative, it is included in the $Q_{i}$ term of Lagrange's equations,

$$\frac{d}{dt}\frac{\partial L}{\partial \dot{q_{i}}}-\frac{\partial L}{\partial q_{i}}=Q_{i}$$.

Applying of the value of the frictional force described by generalized coordinates into the Euler-Lagrange equations gives

$$\frac{d}{dt}\left(\frac{\partial L}{\partial \dot{q_{i}}}\right)-\frac{\partial L}{\partial q_{i}}=-\frac{\partial R}{\partial\dot{q}_{i}}$$.

Rayleigh writes the Lagrangian $L$ as kinetic energy $T$ minus potential energy $V$, which yields Rayleigh's equation from 1873.

$$\frac{d}{dt}\left(\frac{\partial T}{\partial \dot{q_{i}}}\right) - \frac{\partial T}{\partial q_i}+
\frac{\partial R}{\partial\dot{q}_{i}}
+\frac{\partial V}{\partial q_{i}}=0$$.

Since the 1970s the name Rayleigh dissipation potential for $R$ is more common. Moreover, the original theory is generalized from quadratic functions $q \mapsto R(\dot q)=\frac12 \dot q \cdot \mathbb V \dot q$ to dissipation potentials that are depending on $q$ (then called state dependence) and are non-quadratic, which leads to nonlinear friction laws like in Coulomb friction or in plasticity. The main assumption is then, that the mapping $\dot q \mapsto R(q,\dot q)$ is convex and satisfies $0 = R(q,0)\leq R(q, \dot q)$.
