= American Meteorological Society =

American non-profit and society

- AMS logo

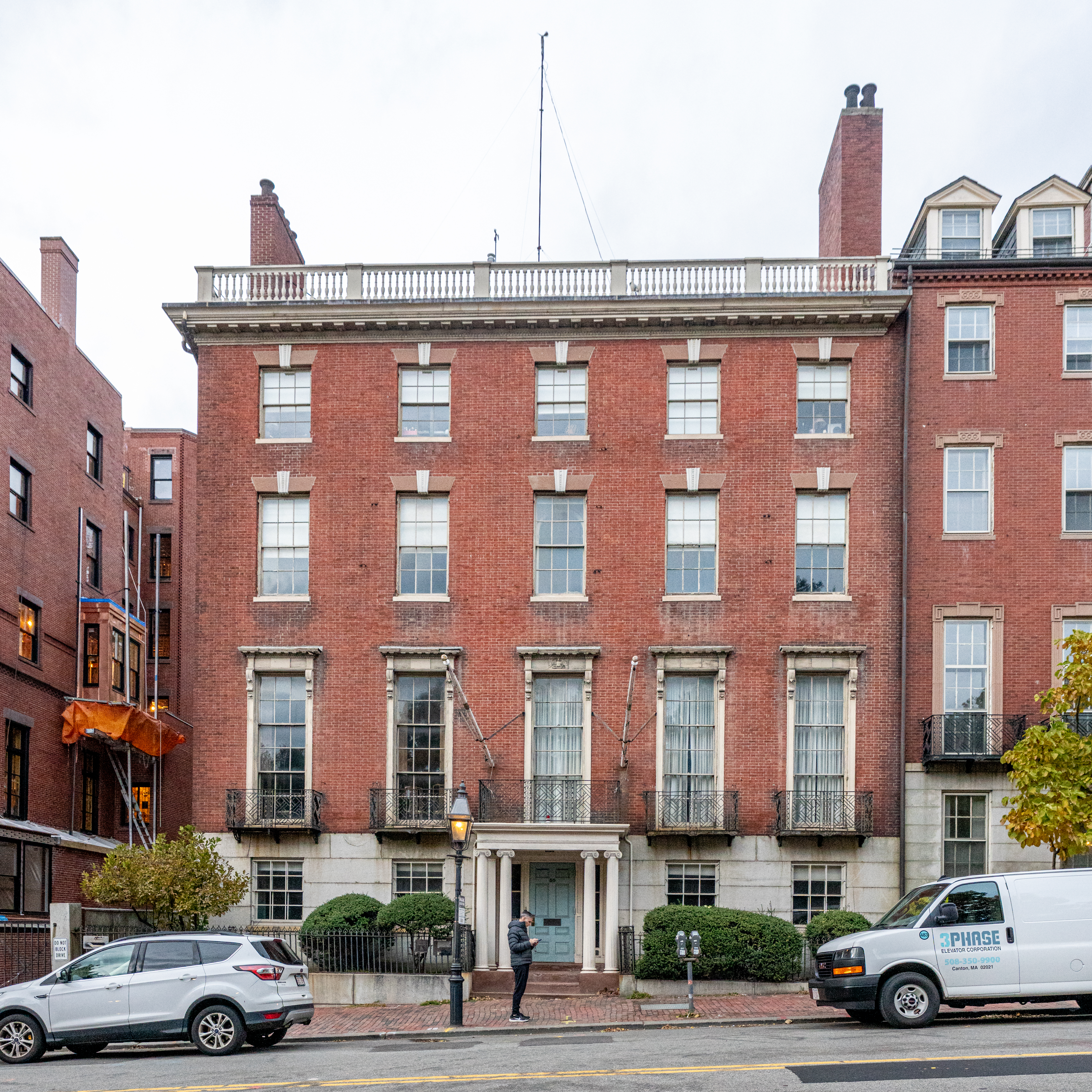
- Harrison Gray Otis House on Beacon Street in Boston
- Abbreviation: AMS
- Formation: 1919
- Founder: Charles Franklin Brooks
- Type: Scientific society
- Legal status: Non-profit
- Headquarters: Boston, Massachusetts, U.S.
- Coordinates: 42°21′24.8″N 71°04′01.3″W
- Region served: Primarily United States
- Members: 13,000+
- President: David Stensrud
- Subsidiaries: Local and student chapters
- Affiliations: American Association for the Advancement of Science, American Institute of Physics, American Society of Association Executives, Bookbuilders of Boston, Council for Agricultural Science and Technology, Council of Engineering and Scientific Society Executives, Commission on Professionals in Science and Technology, Intelligent Transportation Society of America, Renewable Natural Resources Foundation, Society for Scholarly Publishing
- Staff: 100
- Website: ametsoc.org

The American Meteorological Society (AMS) is a scientific and professional organization in the United States promoting and disseminating information about the atmospheric, oceanic, and hydrologic sciences. Its mission is to advance the atmospheric and related sciences, technologies, specifications, applications and services for the benefit of society.

== Background ==
Founded on December 29, 1919, by Charles F. Brooks, at a meeting of the American Association for the Advancement of Science in St. Louis, and incorporated on January 21, 1920, the American Meteorological Society has a membership of more than 13,000 weather, water, and climate scientists, professionals, researchers, educators, students, and enthusiasts.

AMS publishes 12 atmospheric and related oceanic and hydrologic journals (in print and online), sponsors as many as twelve conferences annually, and administers professional certification programs and awards. The AMS Policy and Education programs promote scientific knowledge and work to increase public understanding of science. There is also a network of 94 local and student AMS chapters.

AMS headquarters is located at 45 Beacon Street adjacent to the Boston Common in Boston, Massachusetts. The headquarters building was designed by Charles Bulfinch as the third Harrison Gray Otis House in 1806 and was purchased and renovated by AMS in 1958, with staff moving into the building in 1960. In 2012, AMS purchased the building next door at 44 Beacon Street, also designed by Bulfinch. AMS also maintains an office in Washington, D.C., at 1200 New York Avenue NW inside the AAAS headquarters.

The American Meteorological Society is not to be confused with the American Meteor Society, a group of volunteers who observe and track meteors and fireballs.

== Certification programs ==
AMS maintains five professional certification programs. The Certified Broadcast Meteorologist (CBM) program sets a professional standard in broadcast meteorology. The Certified Consulting Meteorologist (CCM) program establishes high standards of technical competence, character, and experience for consultants who provide advice in meteorology to the public. The Certified Digital Meteorologist Program (CDM) program sets standards for meteorologists who meet criteria for effective communication in all forms of digital media. The AMS Seal of Approval was launched in 1957 to recognize on-air meteorologists for their sound delivery of weather information to the general public. Many seal holders are still active, though the original Seal was succeeded by the CBM. Those looking for an expert can consult the listings of all AMS Certified individuals. A recent addition is the Certified AMS Teacher (CAT), a graduate-level certificate for K-12 teachers.

== Awards ==
AMS recognizes excellent work with over 30 different awards ranging from outstanding research contributions in specific fields to awards for excellence in teaching or broadcasting, outstanding books, exceptional service in forecasting, and more, including its highest honor: the Carl-Gustaf Rossby Medal.

AMS also awards more than $100,000 annually in undergraduate and graduate level scholarships and fellowships.

== Publications ==
AMS publishes twelve peer-reviewed scientific journals, as well as books and monographs, accounting for more than 34,000 pages each year.

- Artificial Intelligence for the Earth Systems (AIES)
- Bulletin of the American Meteorological Society (BAMS)
- Journal of the Atmospheric Sciences (JAS)
- Journal of Applied Meteorology and Climatology (JAMC)
- Journal of Physical Oceanography (JPO)
- Monthly Weather Review (MWR)
- Journal of Atmospheric and Oceanic Technology (JTECH)
- Weather and Forecasting (WAF)
- Journal of Climate (JCLI)
- Journal of Hydrometeorology (JHM)
- Weather, Climate, and Society (WCAS)
- Earth Interactions (EI) (co-published with AGU & AAG)
- Meteorological Monographs

In addition, AMS publishes the Glossary of Meteorology, a blog called the Front Page, and the scientific database Meteorological and Geoastrophysical Abstracts.

AMS is a member of Crossref, Portico, CHORUS, and CLOCKSS.

== Policy Program ==
The AMS Policy Program works to increase public understanding of the role of scientific information in societal advancement and helps policy-makers ground their decisions in the best available scientific knowledge. It carries out research, holds periodic briefings that allow experts to inform policy makers directly on established scientific understanding and the latest policy-relevant research, and hosts an annual Summer Policy Colloquium to introduce Earth scientists to the federal policy process. The Congressional Science Fellowship places an AMS scientist on the staff of a member of Congress for one full year.

== Statements ==
AMS issues and periodically updates four different types of statements on topics that fall within the scope of AMS expertise:

- Information statements aim to provide a trustworthy, objective and scientifically up-to-date explanation of scientific issues of concern to the public at large. They deal with subjects such as climate change and drought.
- Policy statements are aimed at officials of government or international bodies and may articulate the state of scientific understanding, raise awareness of a scientific issue, or make policy recommendations based on the professional and scientific expertise and perspectives of the AMS (examples: Weather, Water, and Climate Priorities; Geoengineering the Climate System; Space Weather)
- Professional guidance statements alert AMS members to urgent or important AMS, professional or scientific matters. (examples: Strengthening Social Sciences in the Weather–Climate Enterprise; Green Meetings)
- Best Practice statements inform AMS members and the public about AMS endorsed best practices across the weather, water, and climate enterprise and promote scientifically based standards and practices (example: Best Practices for Publicly Sharing Weather Information Via Social Media).

== Meetings and events ==
AMS organizes a large number national and international meetings, specialized conferences and workshops. Annually, more than 6,000 people attend AMS meetings covering science, technology and applications in the atmospheric and related oceanographic and hydrologic sciences. In addition to the AMS Annual Meeting, the most recent of which was held in Houston, Texas, United States, during 25 to 29 January 2026, a number of specialty meetings are held each year. AMS records oral presentations given at its meetings and posts them online for anyone to view free of charge.

Over thirty conferences and symposia are held concurrently during the AMS Annual Meeting, during which more than 2000 Oral Presentations are given, and more than 1000 Posters are presented by both professionals and students. The AMS Annual Meeting also features an exhibits program, where companies, universities, and organizations participate.

== Education Program ==
The AMS Education Program offers training, workshops, and undergraduate course curriculum to educate the next generation and increase scientific literacy. It claims to have trained over 100,000 teachers.

AMS partners with the National Oceanic and Atmospheric Administration, NASA, National Science Foundation, and U.S. Navy to offer a suite of teacher professional development programs, including three DataStreme courses, Project ATMOSPHERE, and the Maury Project. Textbooks and Investigations Manuals used in AMS DataStreme and Undergraduate Courses are dynamic eBooks with web-based features. Many AMS members contribute to the creation and editing of course materials.

== Membership ==
The American Meteorological Society has more than 13,000 individual members in nearly 100 countries. Membership was initially limited to professionals or scholars in the atmospheric or related sciences, but today an array of membership categories accommodate a wide range of people including students, teachers, corporations and weather enthusiasts.

=== Fellows ===
Fellows of the AMS are those who "have made outstanding contributions to the atmospheric or related oceanic or hydrologic sciences or their applications during a substantial period of years". New Fellows are elected annually by the AMS Council of not more than 0.2% of all AMS members. As of November 2018, 1195 members had been appointed as fellows, of whom 327 were deceased and 150 inactive. Notable fellows include Ada Monzón.

=== Presidents ===
The following AMS members served as presidents of the society during the listed periods:

- Robert DeCourcy Ward, 1920–21
- Robert Frederic Stupart, 1922–23
- Willis Isbister Milham, 1924–25
- Charles Frederick Marvin, 1926–27
- William Jackson Humphreys, 1928–29
- John M. Patterson, 1930–31
- Herbert Harvey Kimball, 1932–33
- Isaac Monroe Cline, 1934–35
- Joseph Burton Kincer, 1936–37
- Willis Ray Gregg, 1938
- Robert Elmer Horton, 1938–39
- Francis Wilton Reichelderfer, 1940–41
- Bernhard Haurwitz, 1943
- Edward Hall Bowie, 1942–43
- Carl-Gustaf Arvid Rossby, 1944–45
- Henry Garrett Houghton, 1946–47
- Howard T. Orville, 1948–49
- Donald Norton Yates, 1950–51
- Horace Robert Byers, 1952–53
- Arthur Francis Merewether, 1954–55
- Robert D. Fletcher, 1956–57
- Sverre Petterssen, 1958–59
- Thomas F. Malone, 1960–61
- Morris Neiburger, 1962–63
- Philip Duncan Thompson, 1964–65
- Louis Joseph Battan, 1966–67
- Verner Edward Suomi, 1968
- George S. Benton, 1969
- Eugene Bollay, 1970
- Alfred Kimball Blackadar, 1971
- Richard J. Reed, 1972
- William Welch Kellogg, 1973
- David Simonds Johnson, 1974
- David Atlas, 1975
- Charles Luther Hosler, 1976
- Werner A. Baum, 1977
- George Cressman, 1978
- Chester Whittier Newton, 1979
- Robert M. White, 1980
- Robert Guthrie Fleagle, 1981
- Richard E. Hallgren, 1982
- Earl George Droessler, 1983
- Eugene W. Bierly, 1984
- Clifford J. Murino, 1985
- Joseph Smagorinsky, 1986
- Albert J. Kaehn Jr., 1987
- Roscoe R. Braham, 1988
- Joanne Simpson, 1989
- James R. Mahoney, 1990
- William D. Bonner, 1991
- Donald R. Johnson, 1992
- Robert T. Ryan, 1993
- Warren M. Washington, 1994
- David D. Houghton, 1995
- Paul D. Try, 1996
- Ronald D. McPherson, 1997
- Eugene M. Rasmusson, 1998
- George L. Frederick Jr., 1999
- James F. Kimpel, 2000
- Robert J. Serafin, 2001
- Richard D. Rosen, 2002
- Elbert W. Friday Jr., 2003
- Susan K. Avery, 2004
- Walter Andrew Lyons, 2005
- Franco Einaudi, 2006
- Richard A. Anthes, 2007
- Walter F. Dabberdt, 2008
- Thomas R. Karl, 2009
- Margaret Anne LeMone, 2010
- Jonathan T. Malay, 2011
- Louis W. Uccellini, 2012
- J. Marshall Shepherd, 2013
- William B. Gail, 2014
- Alexander E. MacDonald, 2015
- Frederick H. Carr, 2016
- Matthew J. Parker, 2017
- Roger M. Wakimoto, 2018
- Jenni L. Evans, 2019
- Mary Glackin, 2020
- Michael R. Farrar, 2021
- Richard Dale Clark, 2022
- Bradley R. Colman, 2023
- Anjuli Bamzai, 2024
- David J. Stensrud, 2025
- Alan Sealls, 2026 president elect

== See also ==
- American Geophysical Union
- National Weather Association
