= J. Marshall Shepherd =

American meteorologist

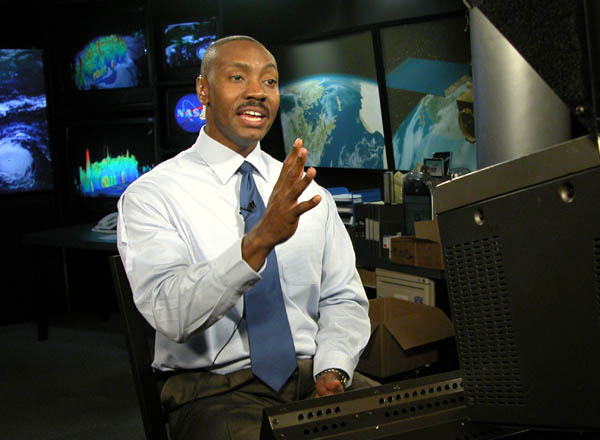
- Born: Canton, Georgia, US
- Education: Florida State University
- Awards: Presidential Early Career Award for Scientists and Engineers; Media Achievement Award from the Association of American Geographers; AAAS Award for Public Engagement with Science; NCSE Friend of the Planet Award (2021)
- Scientific career
- Fields: Meteorology, atmospheric sciences
- Workplaces: University of Georgia
- Thesis: Rainfall morphology in semi-tropical convergence zones (1999)
- Doctoral advisor: Peter S. Ray

James Marshall Shepherd is an American meteorologist, professor at the University of Georgia's Department of Geography, director of the university's atmospheric sciences program, and 2013 president of the American Meteorological Society (AMS). In 2020 he was awarded the AAAS Award for Public Engagement with Science. In 2021, he was elected to the U. S. National Academy of Engineering.

== Early life and education ==
Shepherd grew up in Canton, Georgia, where he first became interested in meteorology in the sixth grade. He had planned to do a science project about bees, but decided to do it about the weather instead after he discovered he was allergic to bees. He received his bachelor's (in 1991), master's (in 1993), and Ph.D. (in 1999) degrees in physical meteorology from Florida State University (FSU), and was the first African-American person to receive a Ph.D. in meteorology from the university. He became a member of Alpha Phi Alpha fraternity, Iota Delta chapter at Florida State in 1988.

== Scientific career ==
Shepherd initially worked at NASA's Goddard Space Flight Center (GSFC) as a research meteorologist for twelve years. He then joined the University of Georgia's department of geography in 2006. He served on the NOAA Science Advisory Board. In recognition of his work in climate science and global climate awareness, he was the 2014 recipient of the Captain Planet award by Ted Turner's Captain Planet Foundation. Shepherd is a contributor to both Forbes and Weather Underground. Shepherd served as the President of the American Meteorological Society in 2013.

== Views ==
Shepherd has written that African Americans may be more vulnerable to the effects of global warming, such as heat-related deaths. He has also spoken out about the United States federal government shutdown of 2013, and has argued that it significantly delayed research into the use of global climate models in the United States, and that it also prevented members of the National Weather Service (NWS) from attending the National Weather Association (NWA)'s annual conference.

== Television appearances ==
Shepherd has appeared on the Today Show and Larry King Live, and, since July 2014, has hosted "Weather Geeks", a talk show airing on the Weather Channel. He also appeared on Face the Nation in 2014.

== Awards ==
In 2004, Shepherd received a NASA Presidential Early Career Award. In 2014, he received a Media Achievement Award from the Association of American Geographers. In 2019, Shepherd won the American Geophysical Union's Climate Communication Prize. In 2020 he was awarded the AAAS Award for Public Engagement with Science. In 2021, Shepherd earned the distinction of being the first UGA faculty member, and one of few faculty, to be elected to the National Academy of Sciences, the National Academy of Engineering and the American Academy of Arts and Sciences in one year. Shepherd was selected as SEC Professor of the year in 2022. The Environmental Law Institute awarded Shepherd the 2023 Environmental Achievement Award in recognition of his work in environmental protection and sustainability. In January 2026, Shepherd was awarded the USG Regents Professor title, awarded to exemplary faculty whose scholarship is nationally and internationally recognized.
