= Kenneth Graham =

Kenneth Graham may refer to:

- Ken Graham, American meteorologist
- Kenneth Graham (trade unionist)

== See also ==
- Kenneth Grahame, British writer
- Kenny Graham, British jazz saxophonist
- Kenny Graham (American football)
