= WCAS =

WCAS may refer to:

== Radio ==
- WAAX, a radio station (570 AM) licensed to Gadsden, Alabama, United States, which held the call sign WCAS from 1955 to 1960
- WFXC/WFXK, a radio station (104.3 FM) licensed to Bunn, North Carolina, United States, which held the call sign WCAS from 1990 to 1992
- WJIB, a radio station (740 AM) licensed to Cambridge, Massachusetts, United States, which held the call sign WCAS from 1967 to 1983
- WLBY, a radio station (1290 AM) licensed to Saline, Michigan, United States, which held the call sign WCAS from 2001 to 2002

== Other ==
- Waljat Colleges of Applied Sciences, a higher education institution in Oman
- Weather, Climate, and Society, a journal published by the American Meteorological Society
- Weinberg College of Arts and Sciences, the largest of the eleven schools comprising Northwestern University, in Evanston, Illinois, United States
- Welsh, Carson, Anderson & Stowe, a private equity investment firm in the United States
- Westmorland County Agricultural Society, an English agricultural society
- Woods College of Advancing Studies, a constituent school of Boston College
- World Council of Arameans (Syriacs), governing the Arameans worldwide
