= Robert M. White (meteorologist) =

American meteorologist (1923–2015)

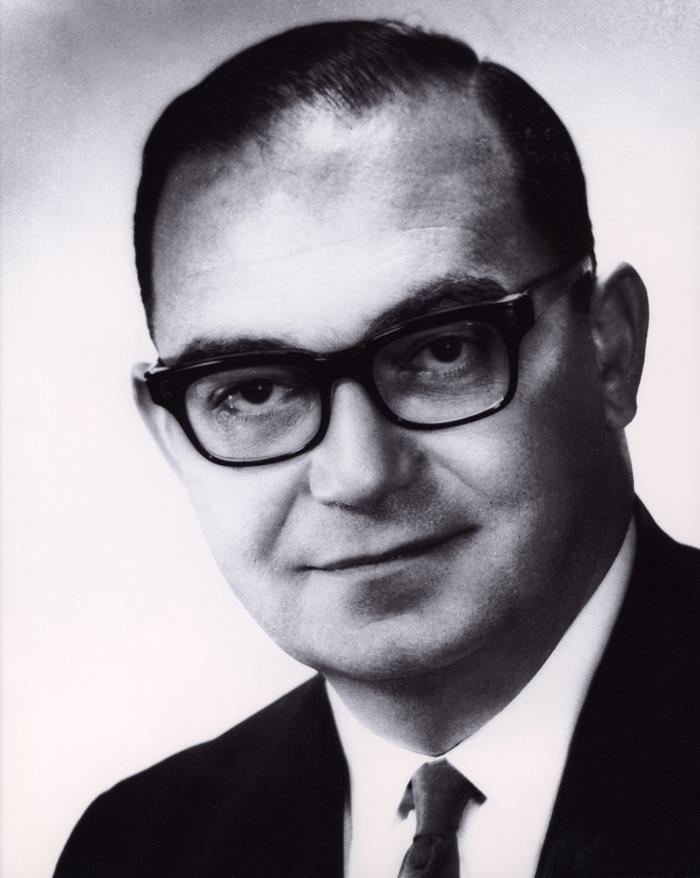

1st Under Secretary of Commerce for Oceans and Atmosphere 1st Administrator of the National Oceanic and Atmospheric Administration
- In office October 3, 1970 – July 13, 1977
- President: Richard Nixon; Gerald Ford; Jimmy Carter
- Succeeded by: Richard A. Frank

Administrator of the Environmental Science Services Administration
- In office July 13, 1965 – October 3, 1970
- Preceded by: none
- Succeeded by: none

Director of the United States Weather Bureau
- In office October 1963 – July 13, 1965
- Preceded by: Francis Reichelderfer
- Succeeded by: George Cressman

Personal details
- Born: February 13, 1923 Boston, Massachusetts
- Died: October 14, 2015 (aged 92) Chevy Chase, Maryland
- Education: Harvard University; Massachusetts Institute of Technology
- Occupation: Meteorologist

Robert Mayer White (February 13, 1923 – October 14, 2015) was an American meteorologist. He headed several national organizations, including the United States Weather Bureau, the Environmental Science Services Administration, the National Oceanic and Atmospheric Administration, and the National Academy of Engineering. He graduated from Harvard University and the Massachusetts Institute of Technology and was a member of the French Legion of Honor.

== Biography ==
White was born in Boston and was an alumnus of Harvard University and the Massachusetts Institute of Technology, holding degrees in geology and meteorology.

He was the director of the United States Weather Bureau from 1963 to 1965, the first and only administrator of the Environmental Science Services Administration from 1965 to 1970, the first administrator of the National Oceanic and Atmospheric Administration from 1970 to 1977, president of the University Corporation for Atmospheric Research from 1980 to 1983, and president of the National Academy of Engineering from 1983 to 1995. He also was the first chairman of the World Climate Conference in 1979.

He was a member of the French Legion of Honor, and received the International Meteorological Organization Prize in 1980 and the Tyler Prize for Environmental Achievement in 1992. In 1995 he was elected an Honorary Fellow of the Royal Academy of Engineering. In 2014 he was honored by Congressman Frank R. Wolf for "groundbreaking contributions to the federal coordination of meteorology in the United States".

He lived in Chevy Chase, Maryland. On October 14, 2015, he died of complications of dementia. His brother, Theodore H. White, was a historian.

Government offices
New office	1st Administrator of the National Oceanic and Atmospheric Administration; 1970 – 1977	Succeeded by Richard A. Frank
