= Jenni L. Evans =

Australian-born American meteorologist (1962–2025)

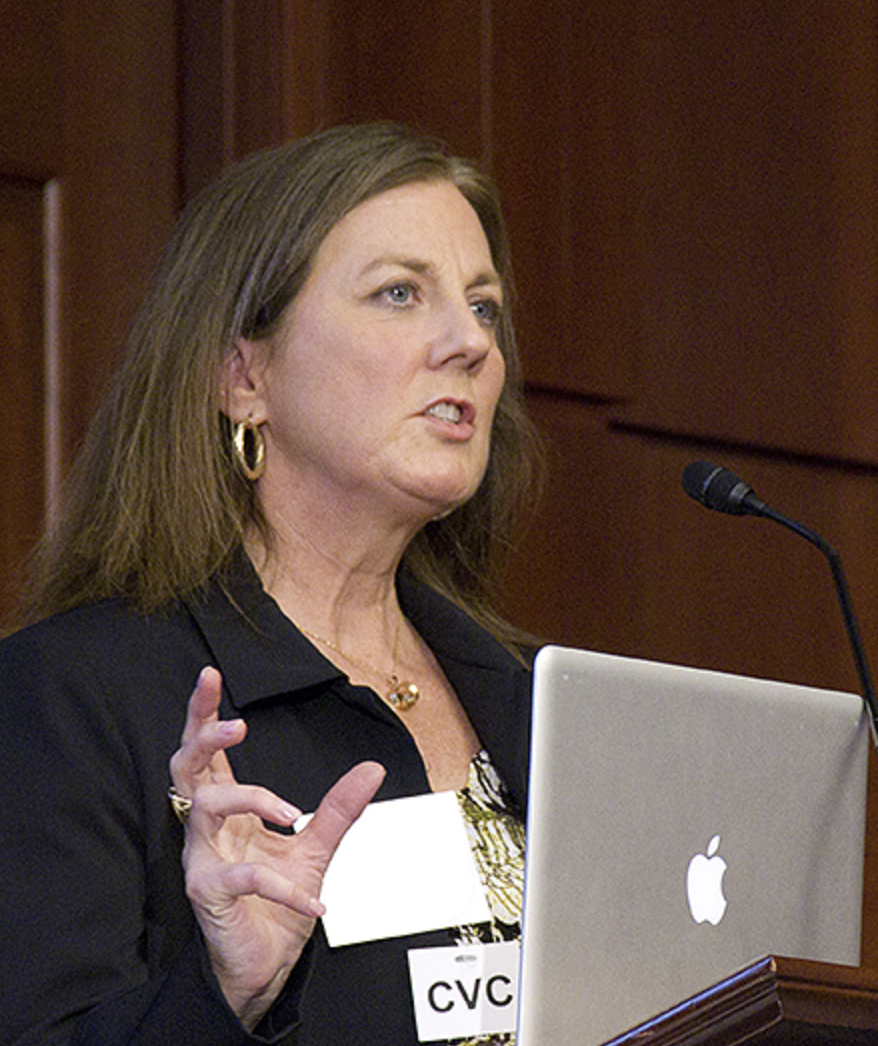
- Evans speaking in 2015
- Born: March 3, 1962; Melbourne, Australia
- Died: April 3, 2025 (aged 63); Boalsburg, Pennsylvania, U.S.
- Education: Monash University
- Spouse: Bruce E. Lord
- Scientific career
- Workplaces: Pennsylvania State University; CSIRO Oceans and Atmosphere

Jenni Louise Evans (March 3, 1962 – April 3, 2025) was an Australian-born American meteorologist who was professor of meteorology and atmospheric science at Pennsylvania State University, where she served as director of the Institute for Computational and Data Sciences (ICDS, formerly known as the Institute for CyberScience). She was a past president of the American Meteorological Society (AMS) and was elected a fellow of the AMS in 2010. In 2019, she was elected a fellow of the American Association for the Advancement of Science.

== Early life and education ==
Born and raised in Melbourne, Evans attended Avila College, a Catholic day school for girls located in Mount Waverley, a suburb of Melbourne. She studied applied mathematics at Monash University, where she graduated with honours in 1984 before going on to complete a PhD there in 1990. Prior to her PhD, she worked on fluid dynamics and observations of the planetary boundary layer. During her PhD, Evans visited the Naval Postgraduate School in Monterey, California and the supercomputing group at NASA Ames in 1987 and 1988. She returned to Monash for her doctoral studies and earned her PhD in 1990, then joined CSIRO Oceans and Atmosphere.

== Research and career ==
In 1992 Evans joined Pennsylvania State University. She earned tenure in 1998 and was promoted to Professor in 2005. In 2017 she was appointed Director of the Institute of CyberScience, which, in 2019, was renamed the Institute for Computational and Data Sciences. Her research considered the genesis and decay of tropical cyclones, including the extratropical transition and landfall. She investigated the impact of climate change on tropical cyclones. She developed statistical methodologies for forecasts of tropical cyclones and a metric to for cyclogenesis activity in climate change situations. Evans investigated the relationships between tropical cyclone intensity and organised convection with sea surface temperature, and how these will change with global warming. She considered how the tropical cyclone boundary layer structures impact the intensity and impacts of convection on the development of African easterly jets. Evans co-chaired the World Meteorological Organization International Workshop on Tropical Cyclones.

Evans described hurricanes as one of the last remaining weather systems that cannot be predicted. She was a member of an interdisciplinary team charged with reviewing catastrophic risk models used for setting hurricane insurance rates in Florida. Alongside her observations, modeling and statistical analysis of meteorological phenomena, Evans developed new approaches to communicate the risk of natural disasters. She worked with Mark Ballora on new ways to demonstrate the risks of hurricanes. Evans contributed her expertise in natural disasters and Ballora his background in music, and together they converted data that is typically in charts or graphs into music. Evans monitored the latitude, longitude, asymmetry and air pressure of several hurricanes and convert this into an audio file. Evans had served as lead meteorologist advising the Florida Commission on Hurricane Loss Projection Methodology.

In 2019, Evans participated in a National Science Foundation grant to establish the Northeast Big Data Innovation Hub.

=== Academic service ===
Whilst serving on the United States Army Science Team, Evans was involved with the relocation of their tropical test facility to Panama. Evans was elected President of American Meteorological Society (AMS) in 2019, which was the 100th year of the AMS.

=== Awards and honours ===
Her awards and honours include;

- 1995 National Science Foundation CAREER Award
- 2010 Elected Fellow of the American Meteorological Society
- 2013 American Geophysical Union Editors Award
- 2019 Elected a Fellow of the American Association for the Advancement of Science

=== Selected publications ===
Her publications include;

- Evans, Jenni L. (2000). "Observed variability and trends in extreme climate events: a brief review". Bulletin of the American Meteorological Society. 81 (3): 417–426. Bibcode:2000BAMS...81..417E. doi:10.1175/1520-0477(2000)081<0417:OVATIE>2.3.CO;2.
- Evans, Jenni L. (2001). "A climatology of the extratropical transition of Atlantic tropical cyclones". Journal of Climate. 14 (4): 546–564. Bibcode:2001JCli...14..546H. doi:10.1175/1520-0442(2001)014<0546:ACOTET>2.0.CO;2.
- Evans, Jenni L. (1993). "Sensitivity of tropical cyclone intensity to sea surface temperature". Journal of Climate. 6 (6): 1133–1140. Bibcode:1993JCli....6.1133E. doi:10.1175/1520-0442(1993)006<1133:SOTCIT>2.0.CO;2.

Evans had written for The Conversation.

== Personal life and death ==
Evans married Bruce Edward Lord, a professor of statistics at Penn State, in 2005.

The ICDS announced Evans' death on April 4, 2025, noting that "she passed away on Thursday, April 3, 2025, leaving behind a legacy of groundbreaking research and dedicated service to the scientific community." She died at her home in Boalsburg, Pennsylvania, at the age of 63.
