= Francis Reichelderfer =

American meteorologist (1895–1983)

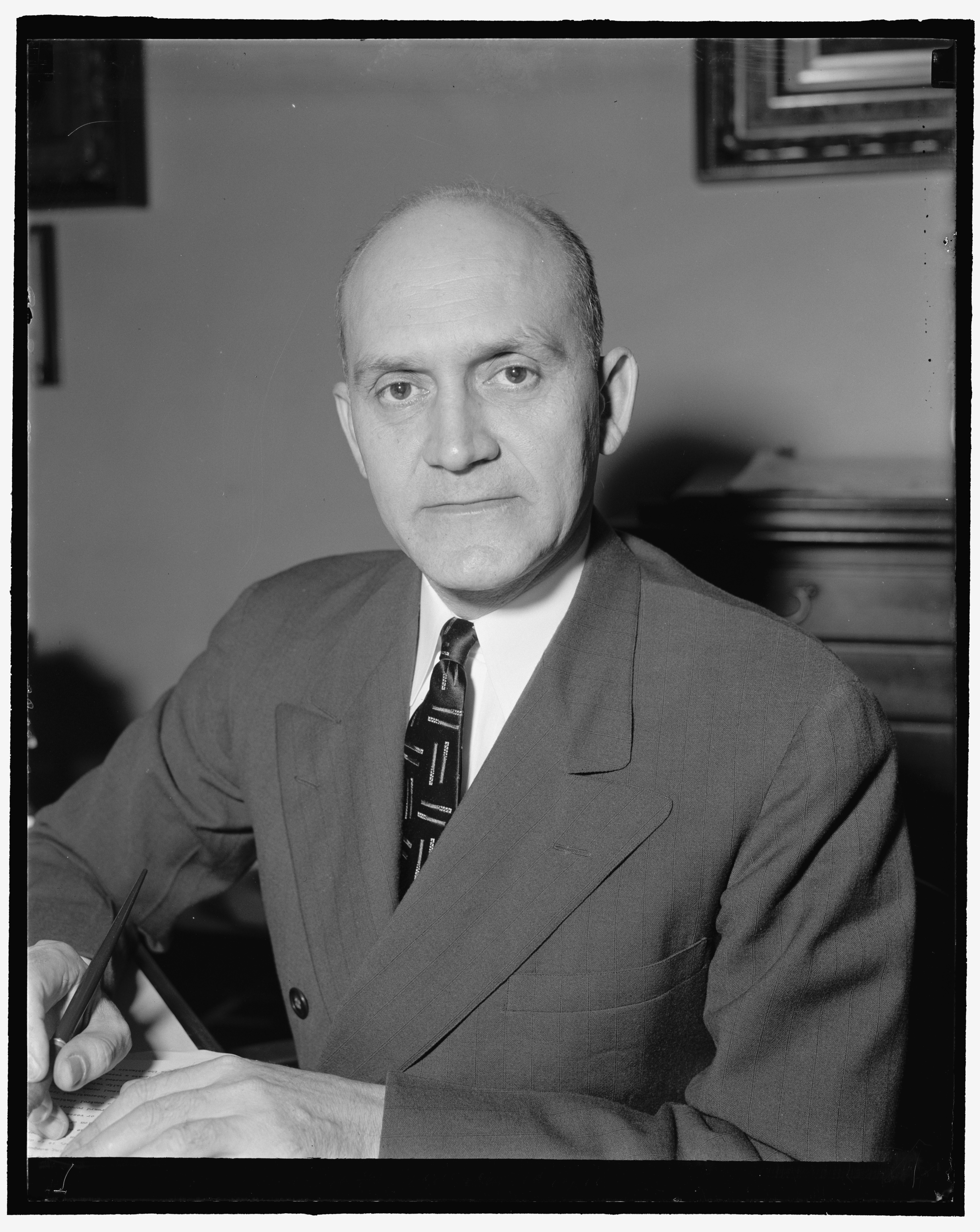
- Born: August 6, 1895
- Died: January 26, 1983 (aged 87); Washington, D.C.
- Employer: United States Weather Bureau (1938–1963); United States Navy (1916–1938); World Meteorological Organization (1951–1955)
- Awards: International Meteorological Organization Prize (1964)
- Position held: director (1938–1963), president (1951–1955)

Francis Wilton Reichelderfer (August 6, 1895 – January 26, 1983), also known as “Reich”, presided over a revolutionary era in the history of the Weather Bureau. He trained as a U.S. Navy pilot and from 1922 to 1928, was appointed Chief of Navy Aerology because of his meteorological and aviation experience. In 1931, he was assigned to the Bergen School of Meteorology. From 1938 to 1963, Reich directed the Weather Bureau and brought modern technology to weather forecasting.

== Early history ==
Reich was born in Harlan, Indiana, in 1895, the son of a Methodist minister. He worked his way through college, rising at 3:30 a.m. to stoke the furnaces and wait tables in a women's dormitory. He did not even begin his career as a meteorologist, receiving a BS in chemistry and chemical engineering from Northwestern University in 1917.

== Navy service, 1917–1938 ==
Reich entered the U.S. Navy Reserve, planning to become a pilot, in 1917. He attended the ground school at Massachusetts Institute of Technology, signing up for courses in aerology (meteorology for fliers), expecting to be sent to Europe. Instead, he was sent to Nova Scotia to brief submarine patrol pilots on weather phenomena. At that time, forecasting had relatively thin scientific foundation, but "Reich," as he was known to his friends, believed forecasting was of crucial importance in aviation and anticipated its development into a more scientific discipline. In December 1917, Assistant Secretary of the Navy, Franklin Delano Roosevelt asked Alexander McAdie, director of Harvard's Blue Hill Meteorological Observatory, to train weather officers for the U.S. Navy. The Navy sent Reich to take the course, thus kindling his interest and launching his career in the field.

He received training as a U.S. Navy pilot and received his wings, meanwhile providing meteorological support for the first transatlantic flight of the Navy's NC-4. In 1919, while assigned to the Naval Air Station Hampton Roads, Virginia, he encountered Billy Mitchell (US Army general regarded as father of the US Air Force) who was forced to land a light plane on the beach ahead of a squall line. The experience is said to have impressed Reich with the importance of accurate forecasting and the need for improving the science.

“Reich” flew in dirigibles including the LZ 129 Hindenburg, a variety of fixed wing aircraft, and competed as a hot air balloonist. Dissatisfied with U.S. texts on meteorology, Reich turned to Norwegian meteorologists Vilhelm Bjerknes and Jacob Bjerknes and was attracted to the notion of treating weather phenomena as physical air mass and frontal movements, instead of basing predictions on tabulation of isobar changes. In 1922, he was appointed Chief of Navy Aerology because of his meteorological and aviation experience, and served in that capacity until 1928. He worked in a corner of the main Weather Bureau offices in Washington, D.C., drawing up maps, comparing them to official forecasts, and pondering the weather. In the mid-1920s he saw the importance of lighter-than-air craft to meteorology, pushed for the expansion of the Navy Aerological Service, and gained an assignment to Lakehurst, New Jersey, as chief meteorologist for all lighter-than-air operations, in effect expanding the Navy's dominance in weather forecasting for aviation.

During the 1920s, while Reich worked at the Weather Bureau, he befriended Carl Gustav Rossby, a Swedish meteorologist who had trained with Vilhelm Bjerknes and Jacob Bjerknes at the Norwegian Bergen School of Meteorology; the school, founded by Bjerknes, was instrumental in advancing concepts associated with fluid dynamics into the field of meteorology and developing the science upon which modern weather forecasting is based. He was doing research on air mass and frontal analysis and simulation of atmospheric circulation, meanwhile establishing the first weather service support for civil aviation. In 1928, Rossby joined the faculty in the Aeronautics Department at MIT, later becoming the founding head of the MIT Department of Meteorology (1941) (the first in the U.S., it is now merged with the Department of Earth, Atmospheric, and Planetary Sciences). Reich also befriended Harry Guggenheim, who funded Rossby to develop the first weather observation and forecast system for aviation in California in the late 1920s; Alexander McAdie of Harvard's Blue Hill Observatory; and Robert Millikan, president of California Institute of Technology, who had extensive interactions with Reich who, in turn, had been sent by the Navy to help Irving P. Krick establish a meteorological department at Caltech. Rossby, McAdie, Guggenheim, and Millikan would later be instrumental in supporting Reich's appointment as Director of the National Weather Bureau, now known as NOAA.

In 1931, influenced by his friendship with Rossby and his familiarity with the teachings of the Norwegian Bergen School of Meteorology, Reich persuaded the Navy to assign him to the school in order to improve his skills in using air mass and frontal movements in forecasting. Bucking conservative meteorologists, he was instrumental in analyzing data using the new principles and influencing other meteorologists to do so. He wrote a paper, Report of Norwegian Methods of Weather Analysis, which was used by Navy meteorological officers and other progressive meteorologists. Following this assignment, he had a tour of duty at sea on the battleship Oklahoma, then back to the Navy dirigible service, and finally to sea as executive officer of the battleship Utah.

In September 1938, Willis Gregg, then head of the Weather Bureau, died suddenly from a heart attack. Although the Navy Department did not control the Weather Bureau, it believed improved forecasting would impact the safety and effectiveness of aviation, which, in turn, would be of major importance if the U.S. were to go to war. Reich's strong background in aviation, advancement as a Naval officer, and established background as a forward thinking, scientific, aviation meteorologist combined to make him a prime candidate to fill the vacancy. The influential colleagues Reich had befriended also championed his application to head the Weather Bureau.

== Weather Bureau, 1938–1963 ==
After 21 years of service, Reichelderfer retired from the U.S. Navy at age 43 to take on the role of Director and to bring the U.S. Weather Service into the modern age, a position he held for 25 years, voluntarily resigning in 1963.

Reich began his tenure as Weather Bureau Chief on December 15, 1938. Although an Air Mass Analysis Section was developed in 1934, the Bureau staff had few career forecasters with scientific training. Reich recruited scientifically trained colleagues including Carl Rossby, Harry Wexler, and Horace Byers, helped found and support training programs in scientific meteorology, and introduced rigorous examination of relevant data, including radiosonde [a modified "weather balloon" developed, in response to a U.S. Navy request, at the National Bureau of Standards by Francis Dunmore and Wilbur Hinmann Jr. under the direction of Harry Diamond [Chief of Research and Development at the Bureau of Air Commerce measurements gathered from high in the atmosphere [The radiosonde was introduced to the Weather Bureau in 1937. It replaced air sampling by pilots who opened their planes at high altitudes.]. To improve forecasting based on mass frontal movements, he collected and analyzed thousands of weather charts and developed a grid of strategically located weather stations, including shipboard ones, which would permit coordinated collection and analysis of the radiosonde data. Starting before the U.S. entered World War II, the Weather Bureau used data from two Atlantic U.S. Coast Guard Weather Stations (WS1 and WS 2) to support and protect thousands of merchant convoys between the Western Hemisphere and Europe, civil and military aviation, and the movement of troop ships. With his naval aerology, shipboard, and aviation experience, his long career in the U. S. Navy, his calm demeanor, and excellent communication skills, "Reich" brought broad expertise to the task of leading the Weather Bureau during the war.

He understood the need for worldwide weather services, helped institute wartime training for hundreds of meteorologists, recruited hundreds of women to replace the men who had entered the armed services, and served on the Joint Meteorological Committee composed of himself and the heads of the Army and Navy weather services. National leaders now viewed weather forecasting, possibly for the first time, as a worldwide strategic imperative affecting the movements of vast numbers of men and amounts of material.

Reichelderfer quickly grasped the importance of technological advances and soon pursued radar as a weather observation and forecast tool. He advanced the study of climatology by overseeing the production of a forty-year series of carefully analyzed surface maps that showed weather patterns dating back to 1899. These aided World War II forecasts and also served as research guides. During the war years he also established an Air Mass and Frontal Analysis Center, which served as a model for other nations' weather services in the years following the war. After the war, “Reich” continued pressing forward, always on the lookout for new methods and new ideas. He was eager to adopt radar meteorology. Earlier proposals by L. F. Richardson in the 1920s, whose formulas for analyzing meteorological data were impractical at the time, led to trials with the first electronic computers [ See John von Neumann Institute for Advanced Study, Princeton, ENIAC]; it would take more powerful computers to handle the mass of data required to make timely, accurate forecasts. A controversial era in Reich's life followed World War II, when cloud physics and the potential for producing rain by seeding clouds with silver iodide or dry ice gained many supporters. Insisting on evidence of effectiveness before committing to such an approach, Reich was accused of being reactionary, but tests by the National Academy of Sciences and others justified his commitment to rigorous proof. So did the beginnings of hurricane research programs, the Aircraft Operations Center, the National Severe Storms Laboratory, and the Air Resources Laboratory. Perhaps the greatest of weather observation innovations, the meteorological satellite, was also introduced during his tenure with the launch of TIROS I on April 1, 1960.

When he retired, in 1963, President John F. Kennedy said: "You have held the post of Chief of the Weather Bureau with great distinction under four presidents...As Chief of the Weather Bureau, you presided over the evolution of meteorology and weather forecasting from an art to a science."

== Memberships, prizes and awards ==
American Meteorological Society, charter member, fellow, honorary member, and President, 1941–42; Cleveland Abbe Award 1964, Distinguished Service, Special Award 1972. The Francis W. Reichelderfer Award was established in his honor in 1982

National Academy of Sciences, 1945

American Geophysical Union, vice president 1949–1953, and 1959–1960; Meteorological Section President 1944–47.

World Meteorological Organization founder and first President 1951-1955 [note: The World Meteorological Organization, under the UN, was the result of the reorganization of the International Meteorological Organization founded in 1873.]

International Meteorological Organization Prize, 1964

American Institute of Aeronautical Sciences

Cosmos Club, Federal Club

== Legacy ==
Reichelderfer was a sailor, aviator, meteorologist, visionary, and administrator. His greatest strengths were comprehending where meteorology should be going, acting to move in that direction, and then attracting and keeping the talent to make it happen. He was instrumental in making important changes in the Weather Bureau through his ability to guide the organization; work with, encourage, and direct talented individuals; and work within the military and political systems of the U.S. and international bodies. His influence transcended the national boundaries as he helped form the World Meteorological Organization and served as its first president in 1951.

== See also ==
- History of surface weather analysis
- Norwegian cyclone model
