= Margaret Anne LeMone =

American atmospheric scientist

- Born: February 21, 1946 (age 80); Columbia, Missouri, U.S.
- Education: University of Missouri, A.B. 1967 (Mathematics) University of Washington, Ph.D. 1972 (Atmospheric Sciences)
- Spouse: Peter A. Gilman
- Awards: 1967 Woodrow Wilson Fellow, NSF Fellow, and NDEA Fellow; 1995 NCAR Education Award; 2004 AMS Charles Anderson Award (Education and Outreach)
- Scientific career
- Fields: Atmospheric sciences
- Thesis: Structure and Dynamics of Horizontal Roll Vortices in the Planetary Boundary Layer (1972)
- Doctoral advisor: Robert G. Fleagle
- Website: www2.mmm.ucar.edu/people/lemone/

Margaret Anne LeMone (born February 21, 1946) is an American atmospheric scientist who uses both atmospheric observations and computer models to study the formation and development of clouds, the development of precipitation, and the structure of storms.

== Biography ==
Margarent Anne LeMone was born in Columbia, Missouri. She graduated from the University of Missouri with an A.B. in Mathematics and earned a Ph.D. in Atmospheric Sciences from the University of Washington in 1972. She joined the National Center for Atmospheric Research (NCAR) as a Post-Doctoral Fellow in 1972, and has worked there ever since in many capacities, most recently as Scientist III.

LeMone was elected to the National Academy of Engineering in 1997.

== GATE Project ==
From 1973 to 1978, and from 1980 to 1982, LeMone worked on the GATE project, or the Global Atmospheric Research Program's (GARP) Atlantic Tropical Experiment, first as a Post-Doctoral fellow, then as the Acting Project Leader in 1974, and finally as a Staff Scientist II of the GATE group. “The central objective of GATE was to look at the effects of smaller-scale tropical weather systems, such as cloud clusters, on larger scale motions (scale interaction), and to improve numerical modeling and prediction methods".

== Mesoscale & Microscale Meteorology Laboratory ==
LeMone worked as a staff scientist II in the Mesoscale Research Section (NCAR) from 1978 to 1980. From 1984 to 1986, she was section head of the Mesoscale Interactions Section, Cloud Systems Division (NCAR). She was group leader of the Mesoscale Interactions Section, Mesoscale and Microscale Meteorology Division (NCAR) from 1986 to 1987. The Publications Page of the Mesoscale & Microscale Meteorology Laboratory retrieves 234 articles with LeMone as one of the authors.

== Selected bibliography ==
=== Books and book chapters ===
- LeMone, M. A., 1993: The Stories Clouds Tell. American Meteorological Society, Washington.
- Carbone, R. E., and Coauthors, 2009: Observing weather and climate from the ground up: A nationwide network of networks. National Academies Press.
- 2007: Strategic guidance for the National Science Foundation's support of the atmospheric sciences. National Academies Press, Washington.
- Spaulding, N. E., Namowitz, S. N., Lemone, M. A., FitzGerald, D. M., & McDougal Littell. (1997). Heath earth science. Teacher's Annotated. Evanston, Ill: McDougal Little.
- Spaulding, N. E., Namowitz, S. N., & Lemone, M. A. (1999). Heath earth science. Evanston, Ill: McDougal Littell.

=== Papers ===
- Lemone, M. A., 1980: On the Difficulty of Measuring Temperature and Humidity in Cloud: Comments on "Shallow Convection on Day 261 of GATE: Mesoscale Arcs". Mon. Wea. Rev., 108, 1702–1705, doi:10.1175/1520-0493(1980)108<1703:OTDOMT>2.0.CO;2.
- Lemone, M. A., 1983: Momentum Transport by a Line of Cumulonimbus. J. Atmos. Sci., 40, 1815–1834, doi:10.1175/1520-0469(1983)040<1815:MTBALO>2.0.CO;2.
- Lemone, M. A., and E. J. Zipser, 1980b: Cumulonimbus Vertical Velocity Events in GATE. Part I: Diameter, Intensity and Mass Flux. J. Atmos. Sci., 37, 2444–2457, doi:10.1175/1520-0469(1980)037<2444:CVVEIG>2.0.CO;2.
- Lemone, M. A., and W. T. Pennell, 1980a: A Comparison of Turbulence Measurements from Aircraft. J. Appl. Meteorol., 19, 1420–1437, doi:10.1175/1520-0450(1980)019<1420:ACOTMF>2.0.CO;2.
- Lemone, M. A., E. J. Zipser, and S. B. Trier, 1998: The Role of Environmental Shear and Thermodynamic Conditions in Determining the Structure and Evolution of Mesoscale Convective Systems during TOGA COARE. J. Atmos. Sci., 55, 3493–3518, doi:10.1175/1520-0469(1998)055<3493:TROESA>2.0.CO;2.
