= Willis Ray Gregg =

American meteorologist (1880–1938)

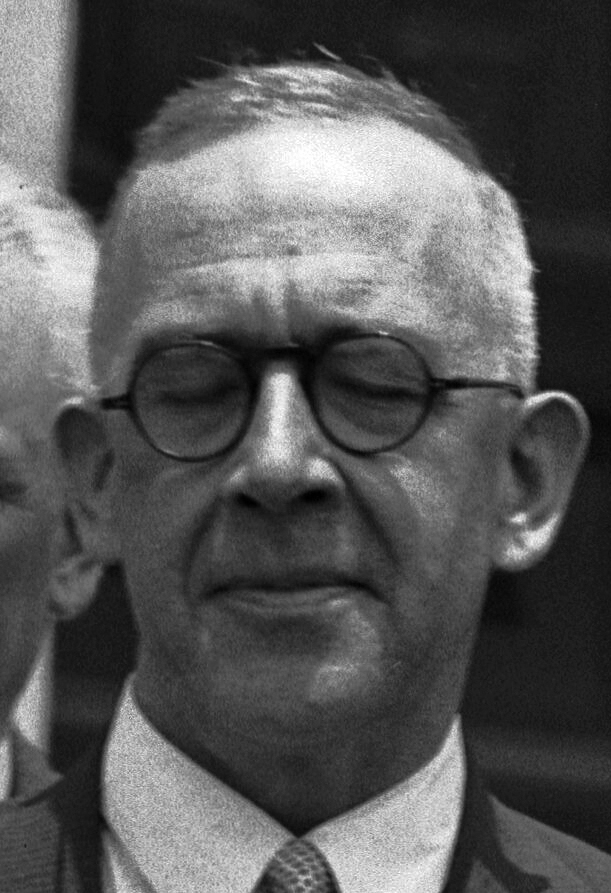
- Gregg in 1934.
- Born: January 4, 1880; Phoenix
- Died: September 14, 1938 (aged 58); New York City
- Alma mater: Cornell University
- Employer: United States Weather Bureau
- Position held: director (1934–1938)

Willis Ray Gregg (January 4, 1880 – September 14, 1938) was an American meteorologist and chief of the U.S. Weather Bureau who made major contributions to aviation.

== Life and career ==
Gregg was born on a farm in Phoenix, New York in 1880 and graduated from Cornell University in 1903. He joined the U.S. Weather Bureau in 1904 as an assistant observer in Grand Rapids, Michigan. He also served at stations in Cheyenne, Wyoming and Mount Weather, Virginia before being assigned to Washington, D.C. in 1914 as the assistant chief of the new Aerological Section. He served as chief of that division from 1917 until 1934, when he was appointed by President Franklin D. Roosevelt to succeed Charles F. Marvin as chief of the U.S. Weather Bureau.

Gregg died in 1938 at age 58 from coronary thrombosis while attending an aviation conference.

== Legacy and impact ==
During his career, Gregg established himself as an expert in both meteorology and aviation. His assignments included serving as meteorological observer to the Smithsonian Institution expedition to Mount Whitney (1914), special meteorological advisor at Trepassey, Newfoundland for the trans-Atlantic flight of the Curtiss NC seaplanes of the U. S. Navy (1919), and meteorological advisor at Mineola, New York for the visit of the British dirigible R34 (1919).

As an administrator at the Weather Bureau, Gregg advocated for improved scientific methods and technologies. Many of his recommendations were put into effect, including air mass methods of weather analysis, six-hourly maps, additional upper air sounding stations for the improvement of weather forecasts, and regular radio broadcasts to pass weather information along to pilots every thirty minutes. He assisted the United States Army in designing searchlights for anti-aircraft defense. He also oversaw an overhaul of how the bureau forecasted hurricanes in 1935. He hired a group of men from the Massachusetts Institute of Technology to join the Bureau's staff and invited Sverre Petterssen to lecture to forecasters.

As a skilled bureaucrat, Gregg lobbied the United States Congress to increase appropriations for research and weather stations while making the case for an activist Weather Bureau. He claimed that "comparatively small increases for weather research" could reduce crop failures, raise nutritional standards, diminish damage and injury from storms, and make travel by land, air, and sea safer. Gregg authored numerous influential technical articles, chapters, and one book, Aeronautical Meteorology (1925).

Gregg served on a number of committees, boards, and commissions, including the International Meteorological Organization, the Commission on Projections for Meteorological Charts, the International Ice Observation Service and the Ice Patrol Service, the Daniel Guggenheim Committee on Aeronautical Meteorology, and as chair of the National Advisory Committee for Aeronautics and its Subcommittee on Meteorological Problems.

He was a member of the American Association for the Advancement of Science, Royal Meteorological Society, Institute of the Aeronautical Sciences, National Aeronautic Society, American Geophysical Society, and president of the American Meteorological Society. Norwich University awarded Gregg an honorary Doctor of Science degree in 1937.

Gregg was named one of the "100 Most Notable Cornellians" in 2003.
