= Richard E. Hallgren =

American meteorologist (1932–2023)

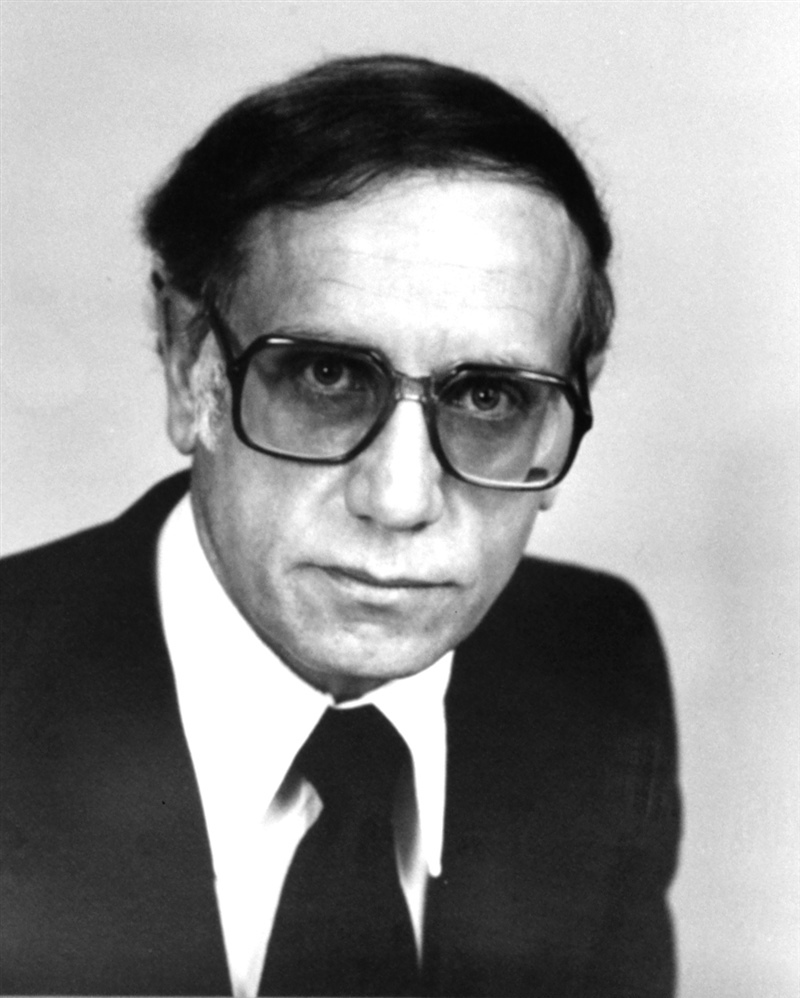
- Born: March 15, 1932; Toby
- Died: November 5, 2023
- Education: Pennsylvania State University
- Employers: American Meteorological Society; National Oceanic and Atmospheric Administration; National Weather Service
- Awards: International Meteorological Organization Prize (1990)

Richard Edwin Hallgren (March 15, 1932 – November 5, 2023) was an American meteorologist. He was a former executive director of the American Meteorological Society (AMS) and held several senior positions with the National Oceanic and Atmospheric Administration (NOAA), including the director of the National Weather Service, director of World Weather Systems and federal coordinator for Meteorological Services and Supporting Research. He directed the National Weather Service from 1979-1988 and was the executive director of the American Meteorological Society starting in 1988.

Hallgren's contributions to meteorology have been recognized with several awards, including the Arthur S. Fleming Award, the Department of Commerce Gold Medal, the Charles F. Brooks Award and the International Meteorological Organization Prize of the World Meteorological Organization.

He earned his PhD and BS in meteorology from the Pennsylvania State University. He is the author of the book A Safer Future: Reducing The Impacts Of Natural Disasters.

Hallgren died on November 5, 2023, at the age of 91.
