= Louis Uccellini =

American meteorologist

Louis W. Uccellini
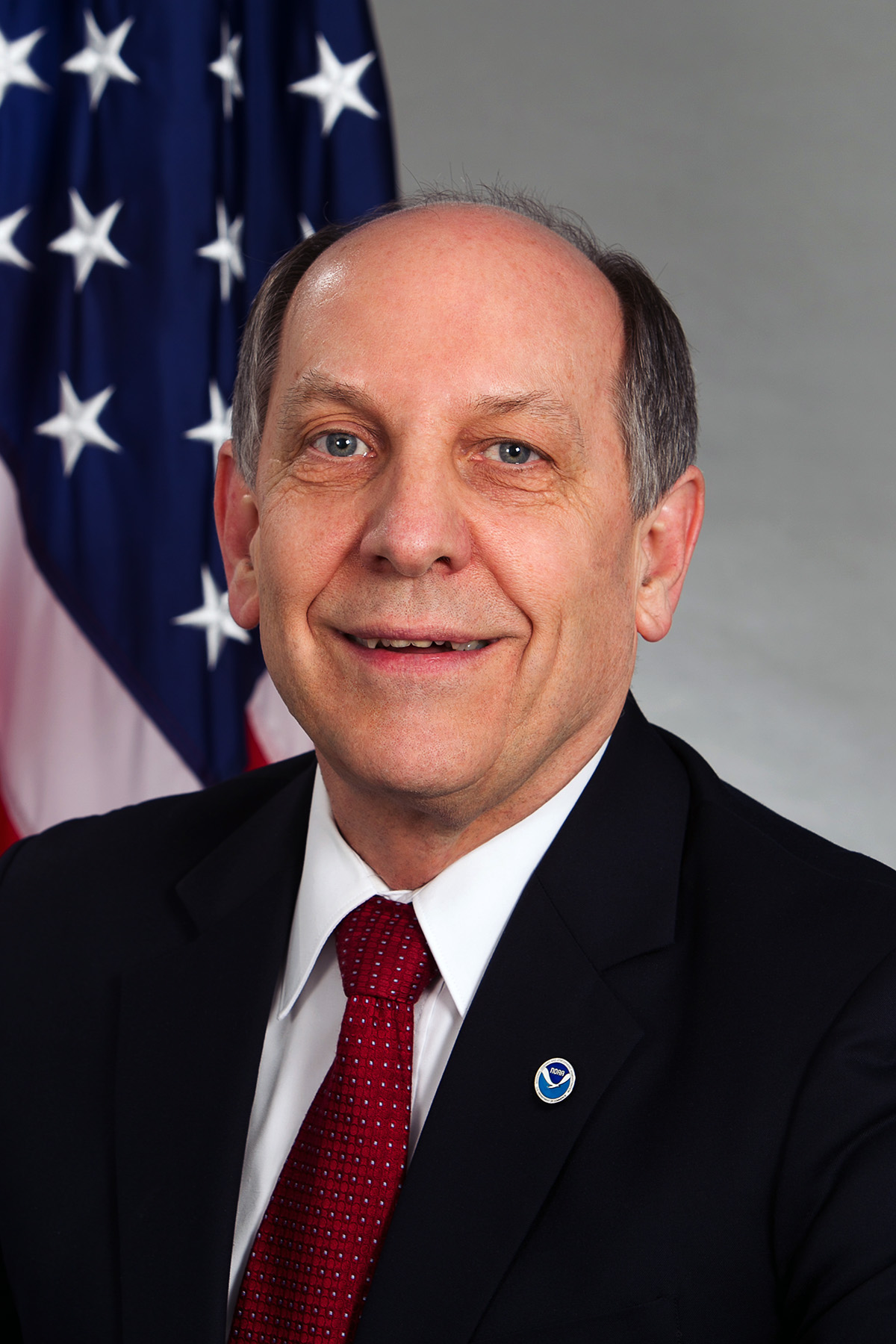
- Official portrait, 2013

Director of the National Weather Service
- In office February 10, 2013 – January 2, 2022
- Preceded by: John L. "Jack" Hayes
- Succeeded by: Ken Graham

Personal details
- Born: Long Island
- Spouse: Susan Uccellini
- Children: 3
- Education: University of Wisconsin–Madison
- Occupation: Meteorologist

Louis Uccellini is a meteorologist and former director of the US National Weather Service (NWS) from 2013 to 2022. He was also director of the National Centers for Environmental Prediction and served as the Permanent Representative of the United States for the World Meteorological Organization.

== Background ==
Uccellini received his PhD from the University of Wisconsin–Madison in 1977. He received his master's and bachelor's degrees from there as well. He was head of the Mesoscale Analysis and Modeling Section for Goddard Space Flight Center. Then he became chief of the National Weather Service's Meteorological Operations Division, followed by Director of the NWS' Office of Meteorology.

During his time as Director of the NWS, he worked to improve relationships with emergency management through Impact Based Decision Support Services and worked to restructure the budget. He also promoted the Weather Ready Nation Ambassador Program. Much of his work also involved the process of applying research to operational forecasting.

Uccellini received the Distinguished Career Award in Professional Achievement in 2022. He was cited for:

"extraordinary dedication to preparing the public for and protecting the country against extreme weather, water, and climate events through an illustrious 43-year career in public service, and working tirelessly to build a Weather-Ready Nation by leading the National Weather Service to provide crucial, life-saving Impact-based Decision Support Service in support of every community."

== Bibliography ==
=== Books ===
- Kocin, Paul; Uccellini, Louis (2004). Northeast Snowstorms: Volume 1 and Volume 2. Springer Science & Business Media. ISBN 978-1-878220-64-6.
- Kocin, Paul; Uccellini, Louis (2004). Snowstorms Along the Northeastern Coast of the United States: 1955 to 1985. Springer Science & Business Media. ISBN 978-1-940033-93-8.

=== Publications ===
- Uccellini, Louis W., Richard W. Spinrad, Dorothy M. Koch, Craig N. McLean, and William M. Lapenta. "EPIC as a catalyst for NOAA’s future Earth prediction system." Bulletin of the American Meteorological Society 103, no. 10 (2022): E2246-E2264.
