= National Weather Service =

U.S. forecasting agency of the National Oceanic and Atmospheric Administration

Agency overview
- Formed: February 9, 1870; 156 years ago
- Preceding agencies: United States Weather Bureau; U.S. Army Signal Service
- Jurisdiction: United States federal government
- Headquarters: Silver Spring, Maryland 38°59′30″N 77°01′48″W
- Employees: 4,900
- Annual budget: US$1.364 billion (FY 2023)
- Agency executives: Ken Graham, Director; Michelle Mainelli, Deputy Director
- Parent agency: National Oceanic and Atmospheric Administration
- Key documents: 16 Stat. 369; NWS Strategic Plan
- Website: weather.gov

The National Weather Service (NWS) is an agency of the United States federal government that is tasked with providing weather forecasts, warnings of hazardous weather, and other weather-related products to organizations and the public for the purposes of protection, safety, and general information. It is a part of the National Oceanic and Atmospheric Administration (NOAA) branch of the Department of Commerce, and is headquartered in Silver Spring, Maryland, within the Washington metropolitan area. The agency was known as the United States Weather Bureau from 1891 until it adopted its current name in 1970.

The NWS performs its primary task through a collection of national and regional centers, and 122 local Weather Forecast Offices (WFOs). As the NWS is an agency of the U.S. federal government, most of its products are in the public domain and available free of charge.

== History ==
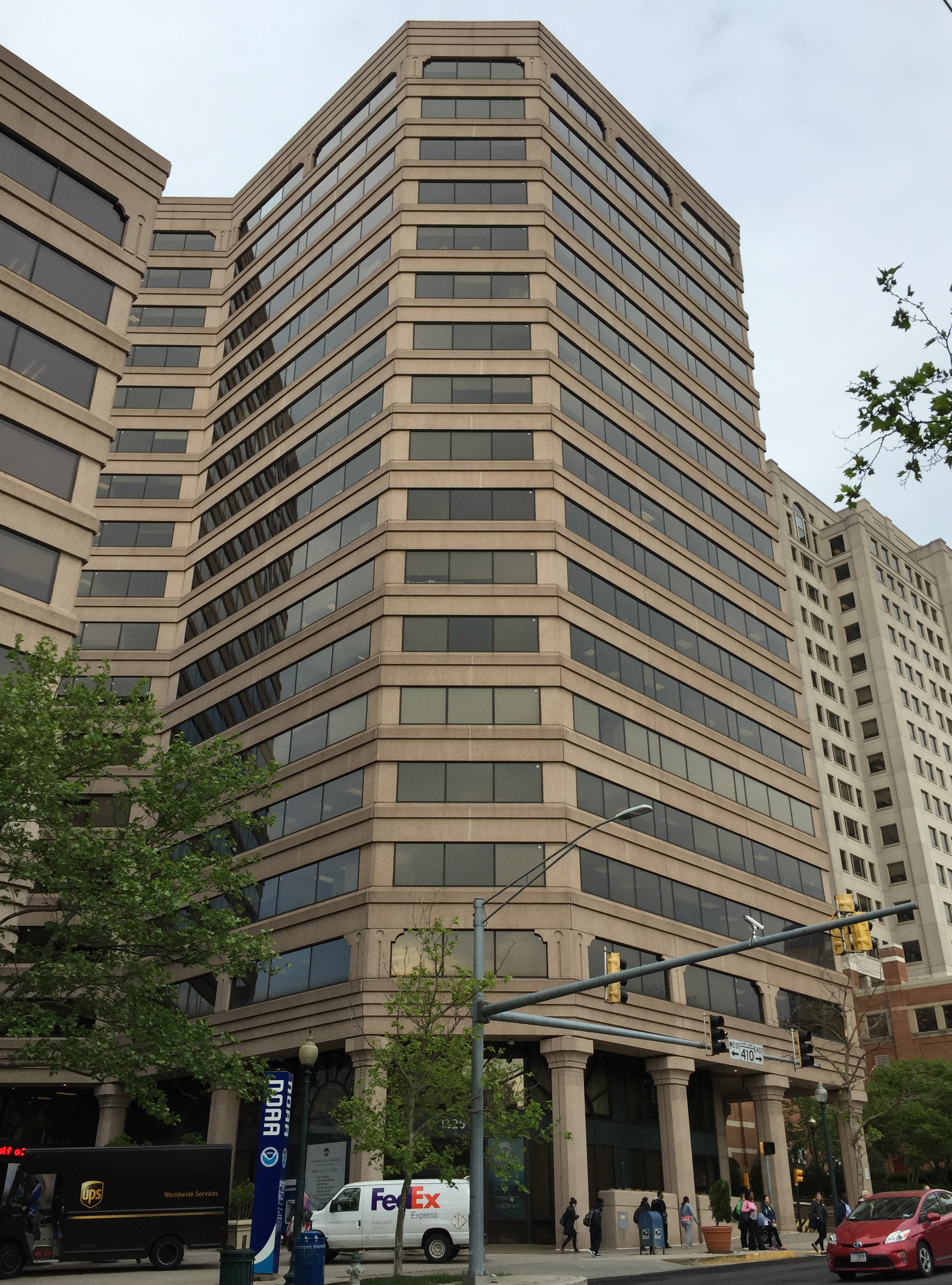
NWS HQ in Silver Spring, Maryland

=== 1870–1899 ===
Early attempts to record weather information can be traced back to Joseph Henry of the Smithsonian Institution, who, after a tornado in Jefferson, Illinois (modern-day Des Plaines, Illinois), in 1855, wrote to the Daily Democratic Press in Chicago for more information about the storm. Organized large-scale weather recording by the Smithsonian led to the creation of the U.S. Signal Service, the earliest predecessor of the modern-day National Weather Service. In 1869, Cleveland Abbe, then director of the Cincinnati Observatory, began developing and issuing public weather forecasts (which he called "probabilities") using daily weather observations collected simultaneously and sent via telegraph by a network of observers. This effort was undertaken in cooperation with the Cincinnati Chamber of Commerce and Western Union, which he convinced to back the collection of such information. Meanwhile, Increase A. Lapham of Wisconsin lobbied Congress to create a storm warning service, having witnessed the destructive power of storms in the Great Lakes region. Representative Halbert E. Paine introduced a bill authorizing the secretary of war to establish such a service. On February 9, 1870, the first official weather service of the United States was established through a joint resolution of Congress signed by President Ulysses S. Grant with a mission to "provide for taking meteorological observations at the military stations in the interior of the continent and at other points in the States and Territories... and for giving notice on the northern (Great) Lakes and on the seacoast by magnetic telegraph and marine signals, of the approach and force of storms." The agency was placed under the secretary of war as Congress felt "military discipline would probably secure the greatest promptness, regularity, and accuracy in the required observations." Within the Department of War, it was assigned to the U.S. Army Signal Service under the chief signal officer, Brigadier General Albert J. Myer. Myer gave the National Weather Service its first name: The Division of Telegrams and Reports for the Benefit of Commerce.

In November 1870, Myer hired Lapham as the first civilian assistant to the new service, but Lapham left less than two years later. Abbe joined as the second civilian assistant to Myer in January 1871 and began developing a system for national forecasts, based on his work in Cincinnati, which he began issuing the following month. Throughout his career with the weather service, which lasted 45 years, Abbe urged continued research in meteorology to provide a scientific basis for forecasting. While a debate went on between the Signal Service and Congress over whether the forecasting of weather conditions should be handled by civilian agencies or the Signal Service's existing forecast office, a Congressional committee was formed to oversee the matter, recommending that the office's operations be transferred to the Department of War following a two-year investigation.

The agency first became a civilian enterprise in 1891, when it became part of the Department of Agriculture and its name officially became the U.S. Weather Bureau. Under the oversight of that branch, the Bureau began issuing flood warnings and fire weather forecasts, and issued the first daily national surface weather maps; it also established a network to distribute warnings for tropical cyclones as well as a data exchange service that relayed European weather analysis to the Bureau and vice versa.

=== 20th century ===
The first Weather Bureau radiosonde was launched in Massachusetts in 1937, which prompted a switch from routine aircraft observation to radiosondes within two years. The Bureau prohibited the word "tornado" from being used in any of its weather products out of concern for inciting panic (a move contradicted in its intentions by the high death tolls in past tornado outbreaks due to the lack of advanced warning) until 1938, when it began disseminating tornado warnings exclusively to emergency management personnel.

The Bureau would in 1940 be moved to the Department of Commerce. In 1941, Margaret Smagorinsky (née Knoepfel) was hired as the Weather Bureau's first female statistician. On July 12, 1950, Bureau chief Francis W. Reichelderfer officially lifted the agency's ban on public tornado alerts in a Circular Letter, noting to all first order stations that "Weather Bureau employees should avoid statements that can be interpreted as a negation of the Bureau's willingness or ability to make tornado forecasts", and that a "good probability of verification" exist when issuing such forecasts due to the difficulty in accurately predicting tornadic activity. After facing criticism for continuing to refuse to provide public tornado warnings and preventing the release of the USAF Severe Weather Warning Center's tornado forecasts (pioneered in 1948 by Air Force Capt. Robert C. Miller and Major Ernest Fawbush) beyond military personnel, the Bureau issued its first experimental public tornado forecasts in March 1952. In 1957, the Bureau began using radars for short-term forecasting of local storms and hydrological events, using modified versions of those used by Navy aircraft to create the WSR-57 (Weather Surveillance Radar, 1957), with a network of WSR systems being deployed nationwide through the early 1960s; some of the radars were upgraded to WSR-74 models beginning in 1974.

In August 1966, the Weather Bureau became part of the Environmental Science Services Administration when that agency was formed. The Environmental Science Services Administration was renamed the National Oceanic and Atmospheric Administration (NOAA) on October 1, 1970, with the enactment of the National Environmental Policy Act. At this time, the Weather Bureau became the National Weather Service. At the beginning of the 1980s the NWS used the same radar equipment as in the 1950s, and teletype for communication. In 1983, NOAA administrator John V. Byrne proposed to auction off all of the weather satellites, to repurchase data from private buyers, outsourcing weather observation stations, NOAA Weather Radio and computerized surface analysis to private companies but the proposal failed in a Congressional vote.

NEXRAD (Next Generation Radar), a system of Doppler radars deployed to improve the detection and warning time of severe local storms, replaced the WSR-57 and WSR-74 systems between 1988 and 1997.

=== 21st century ===
In 2025, the National Weather Service was deeply affected by cuts to NOAA under the second presidency of Donald Trump, including staff being laid off, contracts with universities being cancelled, and restrictions on exchanges with other national weather services. Entering hurricane season, 30 National Weather Service offices were without a chief meteorologist, in part due to Trump administration layoffs.

On August 28, 2025, President Trump signed an executive order, which dissolved the NWS Employee Union, and determined the National Weather Service "to have as a primary function intelligence, counterintelligence, investigative, or national security work". The White House justified this decision by stating that the National Weather Service provides "weather and climate data that inform the weather forecasting used to plan U.S. military deployments. Weather forecasts have long been critical factor [sic] in the success or failure of military operations."

== Forecast sub-organizations ==
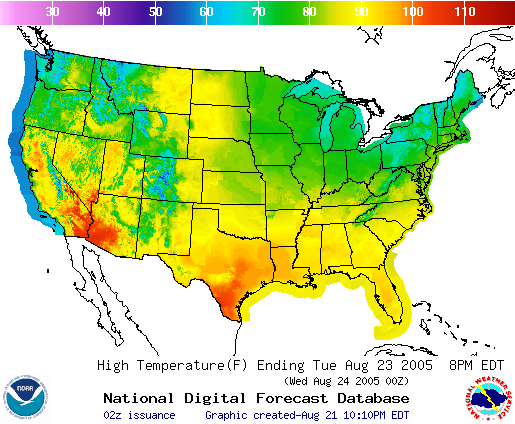
Sample maximum temperature map from the NDFD

The NWS, through a variety of sub-organizations, issues different forecasts to users, including the general public. Although, throughout history, text forecasts have been the means of product dissemination, the NWS has been using more forecast products of a digital, gridded, image or other modern format. Each of the 122 Weather Forecast Offices (WFOs) send their graphical forecasts to a national server to be compiled in the National Digital Forecast Database (NDFD). The NDFD is a collection of common weather observations used by organizations and the public, including precipitation amount, temperature, and cloud cover among other parameters. In addition to viewing gridded weather data via the internet, users can download and use the individual grids using a GRIB2 decoder, which can output data as shapefiles, netCDF, GrADS, float files, and comma-separated value files. Specific points in the digital database can be accessed using an XML SOAP service.

=== Fire weather ===
The National Weather Service issues many products relating to wildfires daily. For example, a Fire Weather Forecast, which have a forecast period covering up to seven days, is issued by local WFOs daily, with updates as needed. The forecasts contain weather information relevant to fire control and smoke management for the next 12 to 48 hours, such as wind direction and speed, and precipitation. The appropriate crews use this information to plan for staffing and equipment levels, the ability to conduct scheduled controlled burns, and assess the daily fire danger. Once per day, NWS meteorologists issue a coded fire weather forecast for specific United States Forest Service observation sites that are then input into the National Fire Danger Rating System (NFDRS). This computer model outputs the daily fire danger that is then conveyed to the public in one of five ratings: low, moderate, high, very high, or extreme.

The local Weather Forecast Offices of the NWS also, under a prescribed set of criteria, issue Fire Weather Watches and Red Flag Warnings as needed, in addition to issuing the daily fire weather forecasts for the local service area. These products alert the public and other agencies to conditions which create the potential for extreme fires. On the national level, the NWS Storm Prediction Center issues fire weather analyses for days one and two of the forecast period that provide supportive information to the local WFO forecasts regarding particular critical elements of fire weather conditions. These include large-scale areas that may experience critical fire weather conditions including the occurrence of "dry thunderstorms", which usually occur in the western U.S., and are not accompanied by any rain due to it evaporating before reaching the surface.

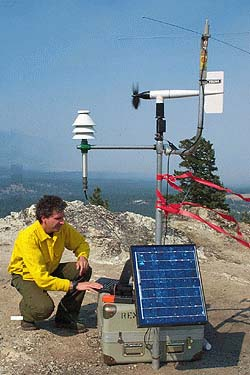
NWS IMET Chris Gibson taking observations in the field

State and federal forestry officials sometimes request a forecast from a WFO for a specific location called a "spot forecast", which are used to determine whether it will be safe to ignite a prescribed burn and how to situate crews during the controlling phase. Officials send in a request, usually during the early morning, containing the position coordinates of the proposed burn, the ignition time, and other pertinent information. The WFO composes a short-term fire weather forecast for the location and sends it back to the officials, usually within an hour of receiving the request.

The NWS assists officials at the scene of large wildfires or other disasters, including HAZMAT incidents, by providing on-site support through Incident Meteorologists (IMET). IMETs are NWS forecasters specially trained to work with Incident Management Teams during severe wildfire outbreaks or other disasters requiring on-site weather support. IMETs travel quickly to the incident site and then assemble a mobile weather center capable of providing continuous meteorological support for the duration of the incident. The kit includes a cell phone, a laptop computer, and communications equipment, used for gathering and displaying weather data such as satellite imagery or numerical forecast model output. Remote weather stations are also used to gather specific data for the point of interest, and often receive direct support from the local WFO during such crises. IMETs, approximately 70 to 80 of which are employed nationally, can be deployed anywhere a disaster strikes and must be capable of working long hours for weeks at a time in remote locations under rough conditions.

=== Aviation ===
The NWS supports the aviation community through the production of several forecasts. Each area's WFO has responsibility for the issuance of Terminal Aerodrome Forecasts (TAFs) for airports in their jurisdiction. TAFs are concise, coded 24-hour forecasts (30-hour forecasts for certain airports) for a specific airport, which are issued every six hours with amendments as needed. As opposed to a public weather forecast, a TAF only addresses weather elements critical to aviation; these include wind, visibility, cloud cover and wind shear.

== Field offices ==
=== Weather Forecast Offices ===
Map of NWS Weather Forecast Offices. Colors indicate area of responsibility, letters indicate each office's call sign. Alaska, Pacific and Puerto Rico offices are only indicated with call sign letters in the corners.

The National Weather Service operates 122 local offices, known as Weather Forecast Offices (WFOs), to issue products specific to those areas. Each WFO maintains a specific area of responsibility spanning multiple counties, parishes or other jurisdictions within the United States – which, in some areas, cover multiple states – or individual possessions; the local offices handle responsibility of composing and disseminating forecasts and weather alerts to areas within their region of service. Some of the products that are only issued by the WFOs are severe thunderstorm and tornado warnings, flood, flash flood, and winter weather watches and warnings, some aviation products, and local forecast grids. The forecasts issued by a WFO are available on their individual pages within the Weather.gov website, which can be accessed through either forecast landing pages (which identify the office that disseminates the weather data) or via the alert map featured on the main page of the National Weather Service website.

=== River Forecast Centers ===
Daily river forecasts are issued by the thirteen River Forecast Centers (RFCs) using hydrologic models based on rainfall, soil characteristics, precipitation forecasts, and several other variables. The first such center was founded on September 23, 1946. Some RFCs, especially those in mountainous regions, also provide seasonal snow pack and peak flow forecasts. These forecasts are used by a wide range of users, including those in agriculture, hydroelectric dam operation, and water supply resources.

=== Center Weather Service Units ===
Twenty-one NWS Center Weather Service Units (CWSUs) are collocated with the Federal Aviation Administration (FAA) Air Route Traffic Control Centers (ARTCC). Their main responsibility is to provide up-to-the-minute weather information and briefings to the Traffic Management Units and control room supervisors. Special emphasis is given to weather conditions that could be hazardous to aviation or impede the flow of air traffic in the National Airspace System. Besides scheduled and unscheduled briefings for decision-makers in the ARTCC and other FAA facilities, CWSU meteorologists also issue two unscheduled products. The Center Weather Advisory (CWA) is an aviation weather warning for thunderstorms, icing, turbulence, and low cloud ceilings and visibilities. The Meteorological Impact Statement (MIS) is a two- to 12-hour forecast that outlines weather conditions expected to impact ARTCC operations.

=== National Centers for Environmental Prediction ===
==== Aviation Weather Center ====
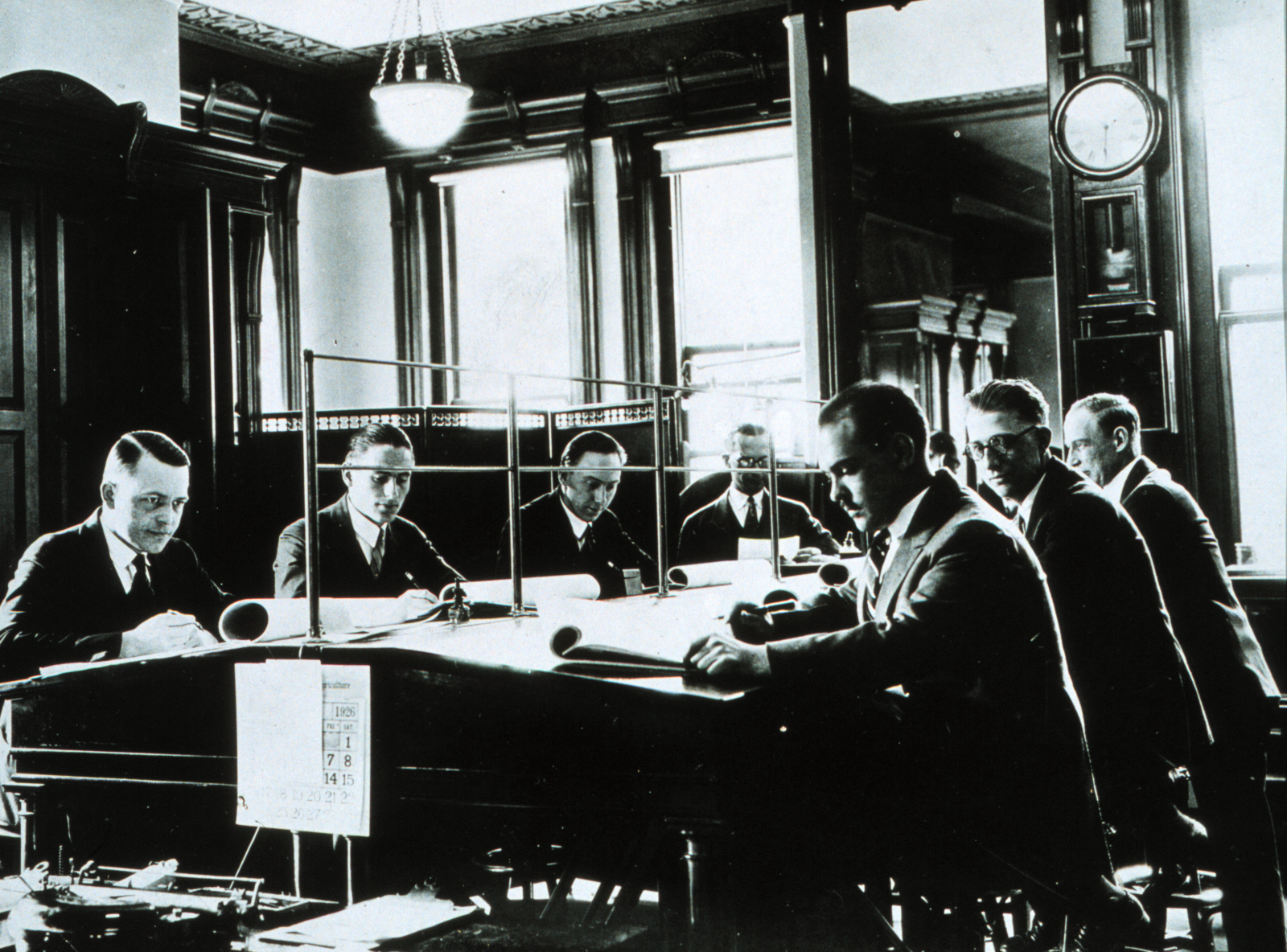
Meteorologists preparing a forecast, early 20th century

The Aviation Weather Center (AWC), located in Kansas City, Missouri, is a central aviation support facility operated by the National Weather Service, which issues two primary products:

- AIRMET (Airmen's Meteorological Information) – Information on icing, turbulence, mountain obscuration, low-level wind shear, instrument meteorological conditions, and strong surface winds.
- SIGMETs (Significant Meteorological Information) – Issued for significant weather that may affect an airport of flight path in an area:
  - Convective – Issued for an area of thunderstorms affecting an area of 3,000 square miles (7,800 km^{2}) or greater, a line of thunderstorms at least 60 nmi (110 km) long, or severe or embedded thunderstorms affecting any area that are expected to last 30 minutes or longer.
  - Non-convective – Issued for severe turbulence over a 3,000 square miles (7,800 km^{2}) area, severe icing over a 3,000 square miles (7,800 km^{2}), or instrument meteorological conditions over a 3,000 square miles (7,800 km^{2}) area due to dust, sand, or volcanic ash.

==== Storm Prediction Center ====
The Storm Prediction Center (SPC) in Norman, Oklahoma issues severe thunderstorm and tornado watches in cooperation with local WFOs which are responsible for delineating jurisdictions affected by the issued watch, and SPC also issues mesoscale discussions focused upon possible convective activity. SPC compiles reports of severe hail, wind, or tornadoes issued by local WFOs each day when thunderstorms producing such phenomena occur in a given area, and formats the data into text and graphical products. It also provides forecasts on convective activity through day eight of the forecast period (most prominently, the threat of severe thunderstorms, the risk of which is assessed through a tiered system conveyed among six categories – general thunderstorms, marginal, slight, enhanced, moderate, or high – based mainly on the expected number of storm reports and regional coverage of thunderstorm activity over a given forecast day), and is responsible for issuing fire weather outlooks, which support local WFOs in the determination of the need for Red Flag Warnings.

==== Weather Prediction Center ====
The Weather Prediction Center in College Park, Maryland provides guidance for future precipitation amounts and areas where excessive rainfall is likely, while local NWS offices are responsible for issuing Flood Watches, Flash Flood Watches, Flood Warnings, Flash Flood Warnings, and Flood Advisories for their local County Warning Area, as well as the official rainfall forecast for areas within their warning area of responsibility. These products can and do emphasize different hydrologic issues depending on geographic area, land use, time of year, as well as other meteorological and non-meteorological factors (for example, during the early spring or late winter a Flood Warning can be issued for an ice jam that occurs on a river, while in the summer a Flood Warning will most likely be issued for excessive rainfall).

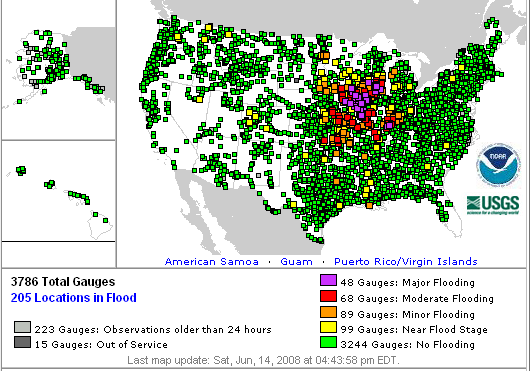
National AHPS map

In recent years, the NWS has enhanced its dissemination of hydrologic information through the Advanced Hydrologic Prediction Service (AHPS). The AHPS allows anyone to view near real-time observation and forecast data for rivers, lakes and streams. The service also enables the NWS to provide long-range probabilistic information which can be used for long-range planning decisions.

==== Ocean Prediction Center ====
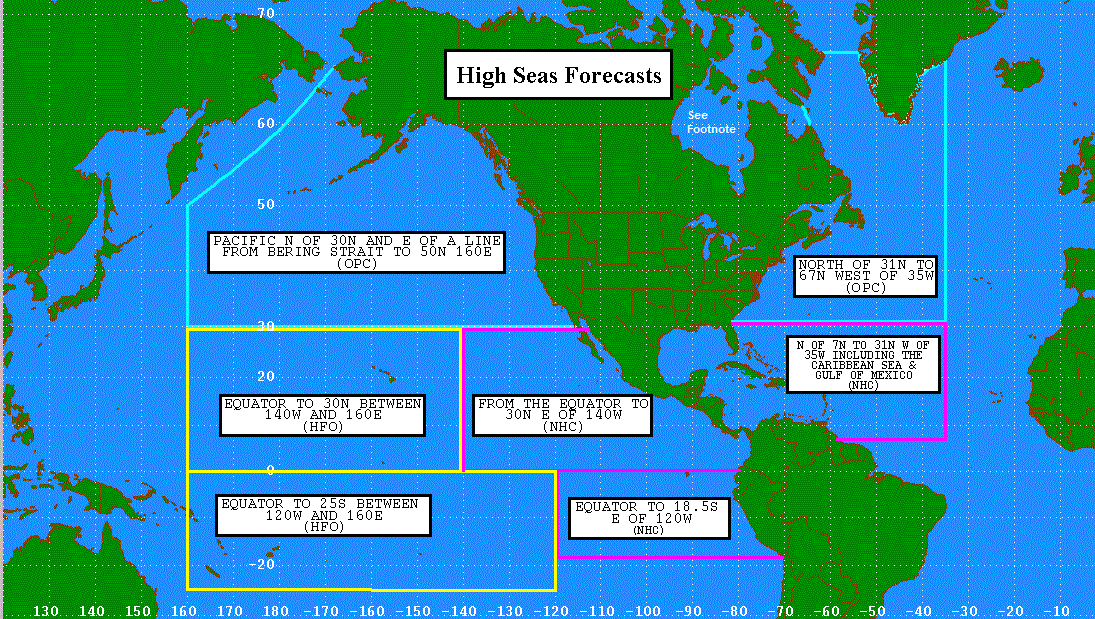
The National Weather Service areas of marine weather forecasting responsibility

The National Weather Service Ocean Prediction Center (OPC) in College Park, Maryland issues marine products for areas that are within the national waters of the United States. NWS national centers or Weather Forecast Offices issue several marine products:

- Coastal Waters Forecast (CWF) – a text product issued by all coastal WFOs to explicitly state expected weather conditions within their marine forecast area of responsibility through day five; it also addresses expected wave heights.
- Offshore Waters Forecast (OFF) – a text product issued by the OPC that provides forecast and warning information to mariners who travel on the oceanic waters adjacent to the U.S. coastal waters through day five.
- NAVTEX forecast – a text forecast issued by the OPC (combining data from the Coastal Waters and Offshore Waters Forecasts) designed to accommodate broadcast restrictions of U.S. Coast Guard NAVTEX transmitters.
- High Seas Forecast (HSF) – routine text product issued every six hours by OPC to provide warning and forecast information to mariners who travel on the oceanic waters.

==== National Hurricane Center ====
The National Hurricane Center (NHC) and the Central Pacific Hurricane Center (CPHC), respectively based in Miami, Florida and Honolulu, Hawaii, are responsible for monitoring tropical weather in the Atlantic, and central and eastern Pacific Oceans. In addition to releasing routine outlooks and discussions, the guidance center initiates advisories and discussions on individual tropical cyclones, as needed. If a tropical cyclone threatens the United States or its territories, individual WFOs begin issuing statements detailing the expected effects within their local area of responsibility. The NHC and CPHC issue products including tropical cyclone advisories, forecasts, and formation predictions, and warnings for the areas in the Atlantic and parts of the Pacific.

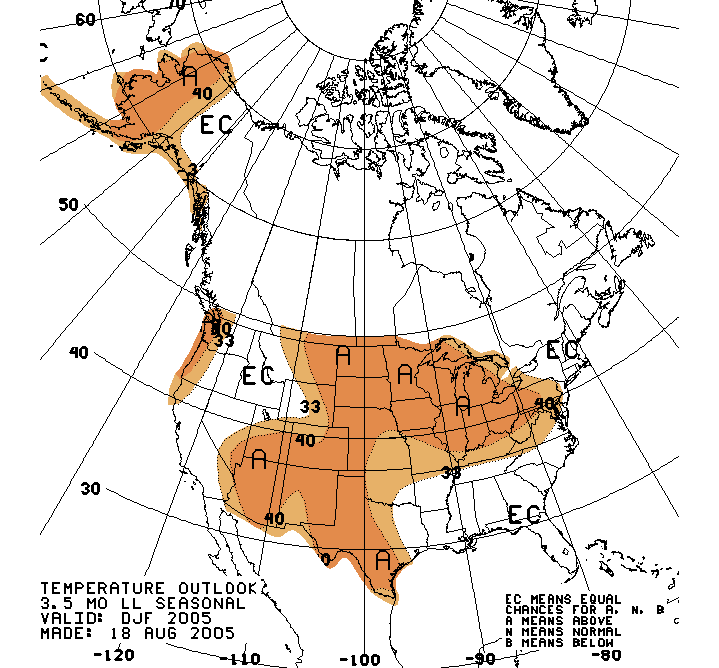
Sample CPC 3.5-month temperature outlook

==== Climate Prediction Center ====
The Climate Prediction Center (CPC) in College Park, Maryland is responsible for all of the NWS's climate-related forecasts. Their mission is to "serve the public by assessing and forecasting the impacts of short-term climate variability, emphasizing enhanced risks of weather-related extreme events, for use in mitigating losses and maximizing economic gains." Their products cover time scales from a week to seasons, extending into the future as far as technically feasible, and cover the land, the ocean and the atmosphere, extending into the stratosphere. Most of the products issued by the center cover the Contiguous U.S. and Alaska.

Additionally, Weather Forecast Offices issue daily and monthly climate reports for official climate stations within their area of responsibility. These generally include recorded highs, lows and other information (including historical temperature extremes, fifty-year temperature and precipitation averages, and degree days). This information is considered preliminary until certified by the National Climatic Data Center.

==== Space Weather Prediction Center ====
The Space Weather Prediction Center (SWPC), located in Boulder, Colorado, is responsible for monitoring and issuing forecasts, alerts, and warnings related to solar activity that may affect terrestrial activities. In particular, SWPC is concerned with how events such as coronal mass ejections (CMEs), geomagnetic storms, solar flares, and other phenomena can impact electric power transmission, GPS systems, HF radio and satellite communications, as well as other potential impacts.

SWPC also issues aurora forecasts for both the Northern Hemisphere and Southern Hemisphere.

== Data acquisition ==
=== Surface observations ===
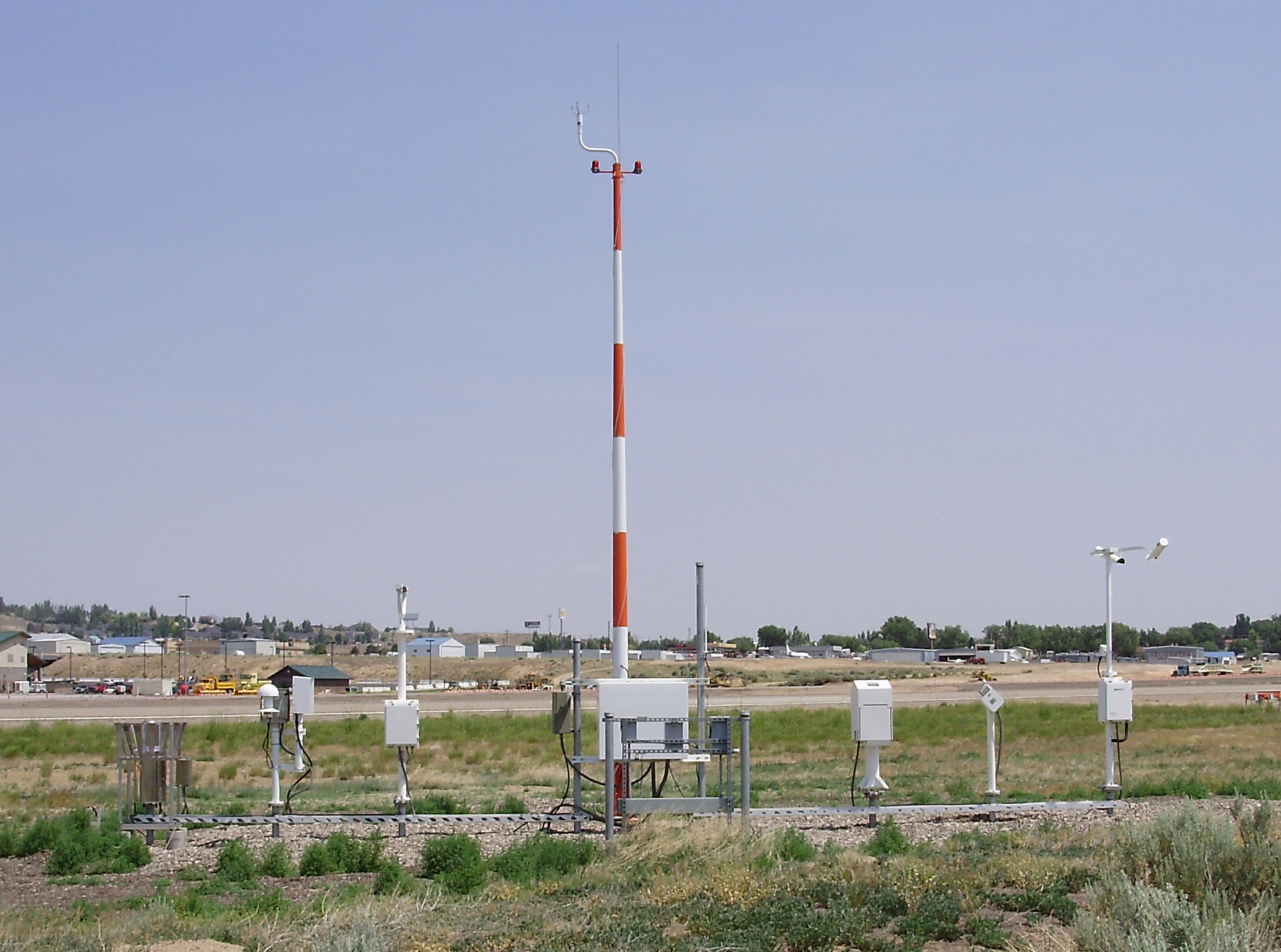
An Automated Surface Observing System (ASOS)

The primary network of surface weather observation stations in the United States is composed of Automated Surface Observing Systems (ASOS). The ASOS program is a joint effort of the National Weather Service (NWS), automatic weather station(AWS), the Federal Aviation Administration (FAA), and the Department of Defense (DOD). ASOS stations are designed to support weather forecast activities and aviation operations and, at the same time, support the needs of the meteorological, hydrological, and climatological research communities. ASOS was especially designed for the safety of the aviation community, therefore the sites are almost always located near airport runways. The system transmits routine hourly observations along with special observations when conditions exceed aviation weather thresholds (e.g. conditions change from visual meteorological conditions to instrument meteorological conditions). The basic weather elements observed are: sky condition, visibility, present weather, obstructions to vision, pressure, temperature, dew point, wind direction and speed, precipitation accumulation, and selected significant remarks. The coded observations are issued as METARs and look similar to this:

METAR KNXX 121155Z 03018G29KT 1/4SM +TSSN FG VV002 M05/M07 A2957 RMK PK WND 01029/1143 SLP026
SNINCR 2/10 RCRNR T2 SET 6///// 7//// 4/010 T10561067 11022 21056 55001 PWINO PNO FZRANO

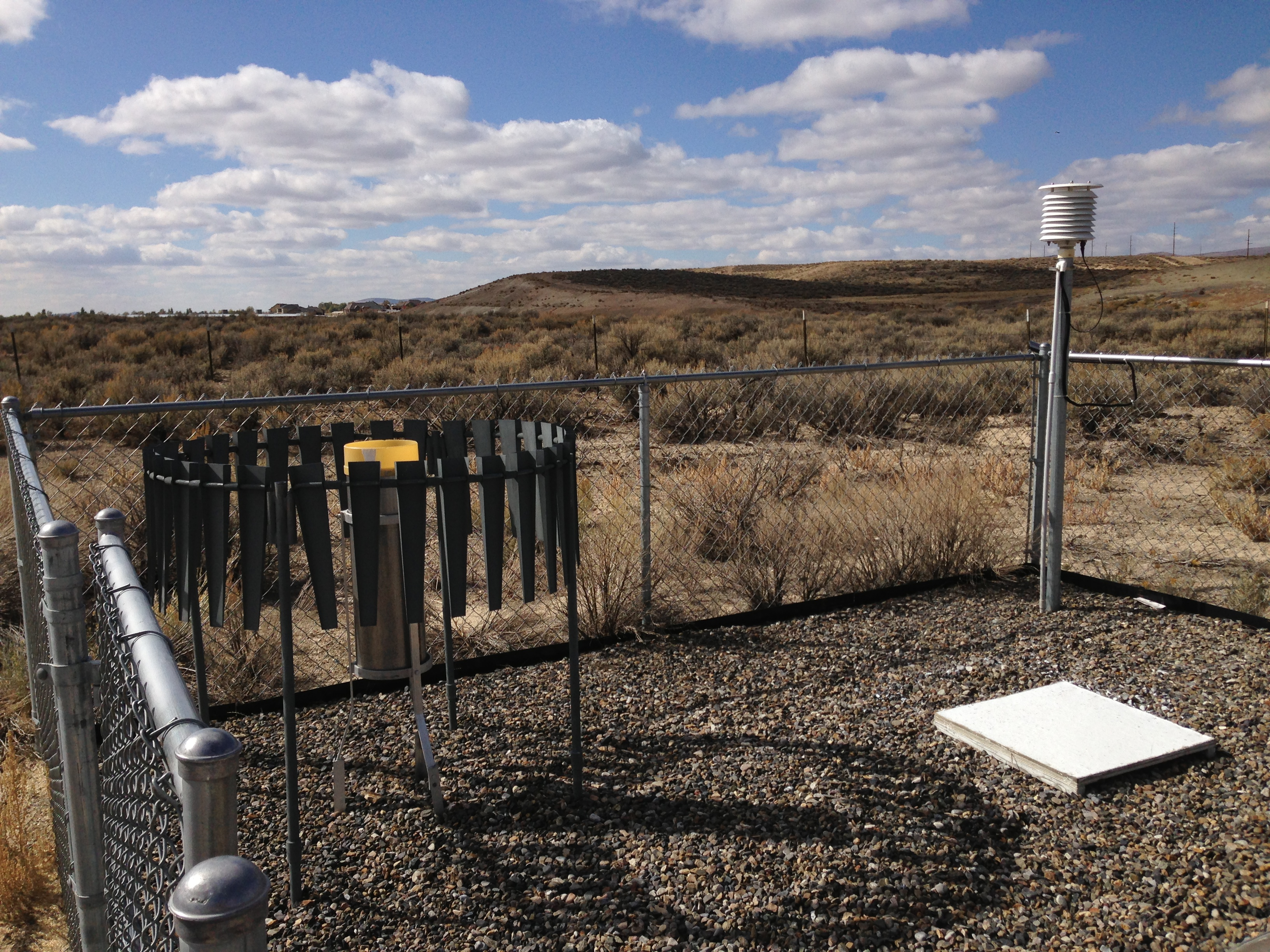
A Cooperative Observer Program weather station

Getting more information on the atmosphere, more frequently, and from more locations is the key to improving forecasts and warnings. Due to the large installation and operating costs associated with ASOS, the stations are widely spaced. Therefore, the Cooperative Observer Program (COOP), a network of approximately 11,000 mostly volunteer weather observers, provides much of the meteorological and climatological data to the country. The program, which was established in 1890 under the Organic Act, currently has a twofold mission:

- Provide observational meteorological data, usually consisting of daily maximum and minimum temperatures, snowfall, and 24-hour precipitation totals, required to define the climate of the United States and to help measure long-term climate changes.
- Provide observational meteorological data in near real-time to support forecast, warning and other public service programs of the NWS.

The National Weather Service also maintains connections with privately operated mesonets such as the Citizen Weather Observer Program for data collection, in part, through the Meteorological Assimilated Data Ingest System (MADIS). Funding is also provided to the CoCoRaHS volunteer weather observer network through parent agency NOAA.

=== Marine observations ===
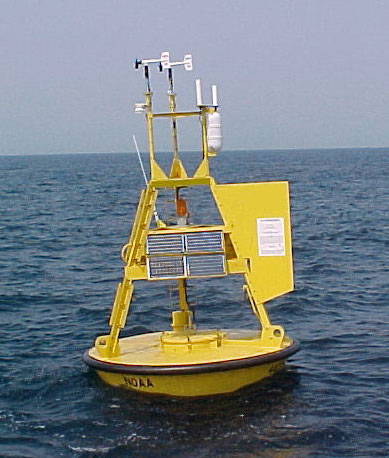
3-metre (9.8 ft) discus buoy located off the Southeast U.S. coast

NWS forecasters need frequent, high-quality marine observations to examine conditions for forecast preparation and to verify their forecasts after they are produced. These observations are especially critical to the output of numerical weather models because large bodies of water have a profound impact on the weather. Other users rely on the observations and forecasts for commercial and recreational activities. To help meet these needs, the NWS's National Data Buoy Center (NDBC) in Hancock County, Mississippi operates a network of about 90 buoys and 60 land-based coastal observing systems (C-MAN). The stations measure wind speed, direction, and gust; barometric pressure; and air temperature. In addition, all buoy and some C-MAN stations measure sea surface temperature, and wave height and period. Conductivity and water current are measured at selected stations. All stations report on an hourly basis.

Supplemental weather observations are acquired through the United States Voluntary Observing Ship (VOS) program. It is organized for the purpose of obtaining weather and oceanographic observations from transiting ships. An international program under World Meteorological Organization (WMO) marine auspices, the VOS has 49 countries as participants. The United States program is the largest in the world, with nearly 1,000 vessels. Observations are taken by deck officers, coded in a special format known as the "ships synoptic code", and transmitted in real-time to the NWS. They are then distributed on national and international circuits for use by meteorologists in weather forecasting, by oceanographers, ship routing services, fishermen, and many others. The observations are then forwarded for use by the National Climatic Data Center (NCDC) in Asheville, North Carolina.

=== Upper air observations ===
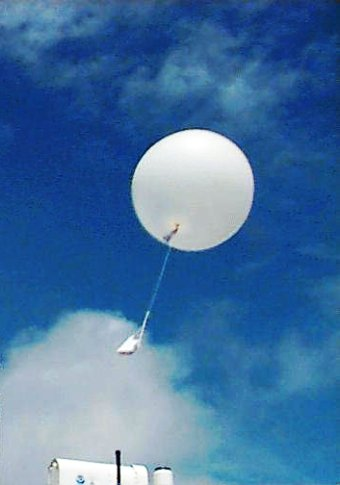
A radiosonde shortly after launch

US upper-air sounding sites status in March 2025: Operational; Reduced; Closed

Upper air weather data is essential for weather forecasting and research. The NWS operates 92 radiosonde locations in North America and ten sites in the Caribbean. A small, expendable instrument package is suspended below a 2 metres (6.6 ft) wide balloon filled with hydrogen or helium, then released daily at or shortly after 1100 and 2300 UTC, respectively. As the radiosonde rises at about 300 meters/minute (1,000 ft/min), sensors on the radiosonde measure profiles of pressure, temperature, and relative humidity. These sensors are linked to a battery-powered radio transmitter that sends the sensor measurements to a ground receiver. By tracking the position of the radiosonde in flight, information on wind speed and direction aloft is also obtained. The flight can last longer than two hours, and during this time the radiosonde can ascend above 35 km (115,000 ft) and drift more than 200 km (120 mi) from the release point. When the balloon has expanded beyond its elastic limit and bursts (about 6 m or 20 ft in diameter), a small parachute slows the descent of the radiosonde, minimizing the danger to lives and property. Data obtained during the flights is coded and disseminated, at which point it can be plotted on a Skew-T or Stuve diagram for analysis. In recent years, the National Weather Service has begun incorporating data from AMDAR in its numerical models (however, the raw data is not available to the public).

Due to cuts to the NOAA under the second presidency of Donald Trump, a number of sites had reduced or eliminated launches.

== Event-driven products ==
The National Weather Service has developed a multi-tier concept for forecasting or alerting the public to all types of hazardous weather:

- Outlook – Hazardous Weather Outlooks are issued daily by individual Weather Forecast Offices to address potentially hazardous weather or hydrologic events that may occur over the next seven days. The outlook will include information about the potential of convective thunderstorm activity (including the potential for severe thunderstorms), heavy rain or flooding, winter weather, and extremes of heat or cold. It is intended to provide information to those who need considerable lead time to prepare for the event, including notification to storm spotter groups and local emergency management agencies on the recommendation of activation during severe weather situations in areas prone to such events. Other outlooks are issued on an event-driven basis, such as the Flood Potential Outlook and Severe Weather Outlook.
- Advisory – An advisory is issued when a hazardous weather or hydrologic event is occurring, imminent, or likely. Advisories are for less serious conditions than warnings, that cause significant inconvenience and if caution is not exercised, could lead to situations that may threaten life or property.
- Watch – A watch is used when the risk of a hazardous weather or hydrologic event has increased significantly, but its occurrence, location or timing is still uncertain. It is intended to provide enough lead time so those who need to set their safety plans in motion can do so in advance if a forecasted event should occur. A watch means that hazardous weather is possible, but not imminent. People should have a plan of action in case a storm threatens and monitor various avenues that provide NOAA-disseminated data to listen for later information and possible warnings, especially when planning travel or outdoor activities.
- Warning – A warning is issued when a hazardous weather or hydrologic event is occurring, imminent or likely. A warning means weather conditions pose a threat to life or property. People in the path of the storm need to take protective action.
- Special Weather Statement (or Significant Weather Advisory) – A special weather statement is issued when something rare or unusual is occurring. These are usually triggered by sudden changes in meteorological conditions. The statements are to be taken as warnings for residents of a specific area. Significant Weather Advisories are often issued for storms not severe enough for Severe Thunderstorm Warnings, but for strong winds and small hail. The warning generally states that an area might be at risk for a slight weather danger, though not all weather statements are warnings. Other times, statements describe informative facts about a weather system (such as local snowfall).

=== Weather warnings and advisories ===
Short-fused weather warnings and advisories issued by local NWS forecast offices are generally less than 500–5,000 square miles (1,300–12,900 km^{2}) in area. Warnings for severe local storms are intended to be issued preceding the arrival of severe weather at a particular locale by one hour or less; the NWS also issues warnings and advisories for various hydrological and non-hydrological events including floods, non-thunderstorm high winds, winter storms, intense heat or cold, fire weather and marine hazards, which vary in timepsan depending on the weather situation (inland and coastal warnings for tropical cyclones are issued by the National Hurricane Center (NHC), a guidance center of the National Oceanic and Atmospheric Administration). The NWS defines a warning as a "hazardous weather or hydrologic event [that] is occurring, is imminent, or has a very high probability of occurring" and an advisory as "[highlighting] special weather conditions that are less serious than a warning [...] for events that may cause significant inconvenience, and if caution is not exercised, [..] could lead to situations that may threaten life and/or property." In earnest, they indicate that hazardous weather conditions are occurring that may pose a risk to life and property, and are intended to direct the general public to take immediate action and heed safety precautions; it also has the side purpose of directing emergency management personnel to be on standby in case the weather situation leads to property damage or casualties. Severe thunderstorm and flood warnings indicate that organized severe thunderstorms or flooding are occurring, whereas tornado warnings are issued if a storm is indicated to be producing an observed tornado or exhibits strong, low-level rotation.

The process of issuing a warning or advisory begins with observations of a hydrological or extreme weather event that is either occurring at present (through radar imagery, reports from local television and radio stations, or ground observations by local law enforcement, civil defense officials, media outlets or storm spotters) or is forecast to occur within 12 to 24 hours. If after collaboration a warning or advisory is deemed necessary, the Weather Forecast Office will generate a bulletin product via the Advance Weather Interactive Processing System (AWIPS) and then disseminate the alert through various communication routes accessed by the media and various agencies, on the internet, to NOAA satellites, and on NOAA Weather Radio.

The product outlines the alert type, the issuing WFO, the sections of government subdivisions (counties, parishes, boroughs or independent cities) covered by the alert, and its time of expiration (based on the local time zone). Some products – particularly for severe thunderstorm, tornado and flood warnings – include a tag requesting Emergency Alert System activation to trigger public alert messages via television, radio stations, NOAA Weather Radio, and smartphone apps and messaging services. For local storm events, the warning or advisory product also outlines a meteorological summary of the most recent storm location or local storm report issued prior to the product's issuance (including the approximate area in statute miles and estimated speed and direction), associated hazards, impacts, municipalities and designated land areas (and, if applicable, highway mile markers) covered by the alert, and boilerplate action messages informing the public of safety precautions they need to take or advising them to be vigilant of any warnings or weather statements that may be issued by their local National Weather Service office. A statement may be issued as a follow-up message to a warning, watch, or emergency, which may update, extend, or cancel the previously issued product or be used as a notification of significant weather for which no type of alert is currently in effect for a given location or is expected to be in effect.

In situations where a forecaster indicates a significant threat of extremely severe and life-threatening weather with an ongoing local weather event, enhanced wording may be used to note the heightened threat by a significant local storm event. In April 2012, the NWS introduced the Impact Based Warning system at its Weather Forecast Offices in Wichita and Topeka, Kansas, and Springfield, St. Louis and Kansas City/Pleasant Hill, Missouri; the pilot project – which would expand to 80 Weather Forecast Offices overseen by the Central, Eastern, Southern and Western Region Headquarters by the spring of 2015 – incorporate message tags within the main body of the product describing the source of the hazard report, damage potential, and if applicable, radar indications or physical observations of tornadoes or the possibility of a tornado; hazards are also summarized at the close of the product text (describing estimated maximum hail size and wind gusts, and if applicable, if a storm has the potential to produce a tornado or in the event of a tornado warning, the basis of the warning or its damage threat). The wording "Particularly Dangerous Situation" (PDS), which originated by the Storm Prediction Center for use in tornado watch products during expected high-end severe weather outbreaks, is subjectively issued. It is occasionally issued with tornado warnings, normally if a large tornado capable of producing EF3 to EF5 damage or staying on the ground for long-duration – sometimes uninterrupted – paths has been reported (although a tornado emergency may be issued in such cases if the tornado is expected to track into a densely populated area). PDS warnings for other alerts occur with even less frequency, and their criteria varies depending on the alert type to which the wording is applied.

Until September 30, 2007, local offices of the National Weather Service issued warnings for severe thunderstorms, tornadoes, flash flooding and marine hazards using geopolitical boundaries. The implementation of storm-based warnings on October 1, 2007, saw alerts for these meteorological or hydrological threats be delineated by polygonal shapes in map-based weather hazard products, which outline the specified sections of government sub-jurisdictions that the warning covers, based on the projected path of a storm as determined by Doppler radar at the time of the warning's issuance; however, entire counties/parishes may sometimes be included in the warning polygon, especially if they encompass a small geographical area. Warnings can be expanded, contracted (by removing jurisdictions where SPC and NWS forecasters no longer consider there to be a viable threat of severe weather, in which case, the storm-based warning may take on a trapezoidal representation in map-based watch products) or canceled before their set time of expiration by local NWS offices.

The NWS also releases Experimental Severe Weather Impact products for use on social media accounts maintained by local forecast offices as well as the Enhanced Data Display (EDD), an experimental pilot project created by the Charleston, West Virginia office's WeatherReady Nation initiative. The product provides a graphical depiction of short-fuse warnings and watches (specifically, tornado and severe thunderstorm watches and warnings, and flash flood warnings), showing a map of the warning area (outlined as a red polygon) and locations (including communities and interstate highways) that will be impacted. For severe thunderstorm, tornado and flash flood warnings, the estimated population count of the warned area and approximate totals of public schools and hospitals within the warning area as well as the maximum forecast intensity of hail size, wind gusts and potential tornadoes; tornado warnings referenced in the impact product also denote whether the warning was issued based on radar indication or ground confirmation.

== Product dissemination ==
NOAA Weather Radio All Hazards (NWR), promoted as "The Voice of the National Weather Service", is a special radio system that transmits uninterrupted weather watches, warnings and forecasts 24 hours a day directly from a nearby NWS office, with the broadcasts covering across 95–97% of the United States' population. The system – which is owned and operated by the NWS – consists of 1,030 transmitters, covering all 50 states; adjacent coastal waters; Puerto Rico; the U.S. Virgin Islands; and the U.S. Pacific Territories of American Samoa, Guam and the Northern Mariana Islands. NWR requires a scanner or special radio receiver capable of picking up the signal. Individual NWR stations broadcast any one of seven allocated frequencies centered on 162 MHz (known collectively as "weather band") in the marine VHF radio band. In recent years, national emergency response agencies such as the Federal Emergency Management Agency (FEMA) and the Department of Homeland Security have begun to take advantage of NWR's ability to efficiently reach a large portion of the U.S. population. When necessary, the system can also be used (in conjunction with the Emergency Alert System) to broadcast civil, natural and technological emergency and disaster alerts and information, in addition to those related to weather – hence the addition of the phrasing "All Hazards" to the name.

The NOAA Weather Wire Service (NWWS) is a satellite data collection and dissemination system operated by the National Weather Service, which was established in October 2000. Its purpose is to provide state and federal government, commercial users, media and private citizens with timely delivery of meteorological, hydrological, climatological and geophysical information. All products in the NWWS data stream are prioritized, with weather and hydrologic warnings receiving the highest priority (watches are next in priority). NWWS delivers severe weather and storm warnings to users in ten seconds or less from the time of their issuance, making it the fastest delivery system available. Products are broadcast to users via the AMC-4 satellite.

The Emergency Managers Weather Information Network (EMWIN) is a system designed to provide the emergency management community with access to a set of NWS warnings, watches, forecasts and other products at no recurring cost. It can receive data via radio, internet, or a dedicated satellite dish, depending on the needs and capabilities of the user.

NOAAPORT is a one-way broadcast communication system which provides NOAA environmental data and information in near real-time to NOAA and external users. This broadcast service is implemented by a commercial provider of satellite communications utilizing C band.

The agency's online service, Weather.gov, is a data rich website operated by the NWS that serves as a portal to hundreds of thousands of webpages and more than 300 different NWS websites. Through its homepage, users can access local forecasts by entering a place name in the main forecast search bar, view a rapidly updated map of active watches and warnings, and select areas related to graphical forecasts, national maps, radar displays, river and air quality data, satellite images and climate information. Also offered are XML data feeds of active watches and warnings, ASOS observations and digital forecasts for 5x5 kilometer (3 x 3 mile) grids. All of NWS local weather forecast offices operate their own region-tailored web pages, which provide access to current products and other information specific to the office's local area of responsibility. Weather.gov superseded the Interactive Weather Information Network (IWIN), the agency's early internet service which provided NWS data from the 1990s through the mid-2000s.

== Technology ==
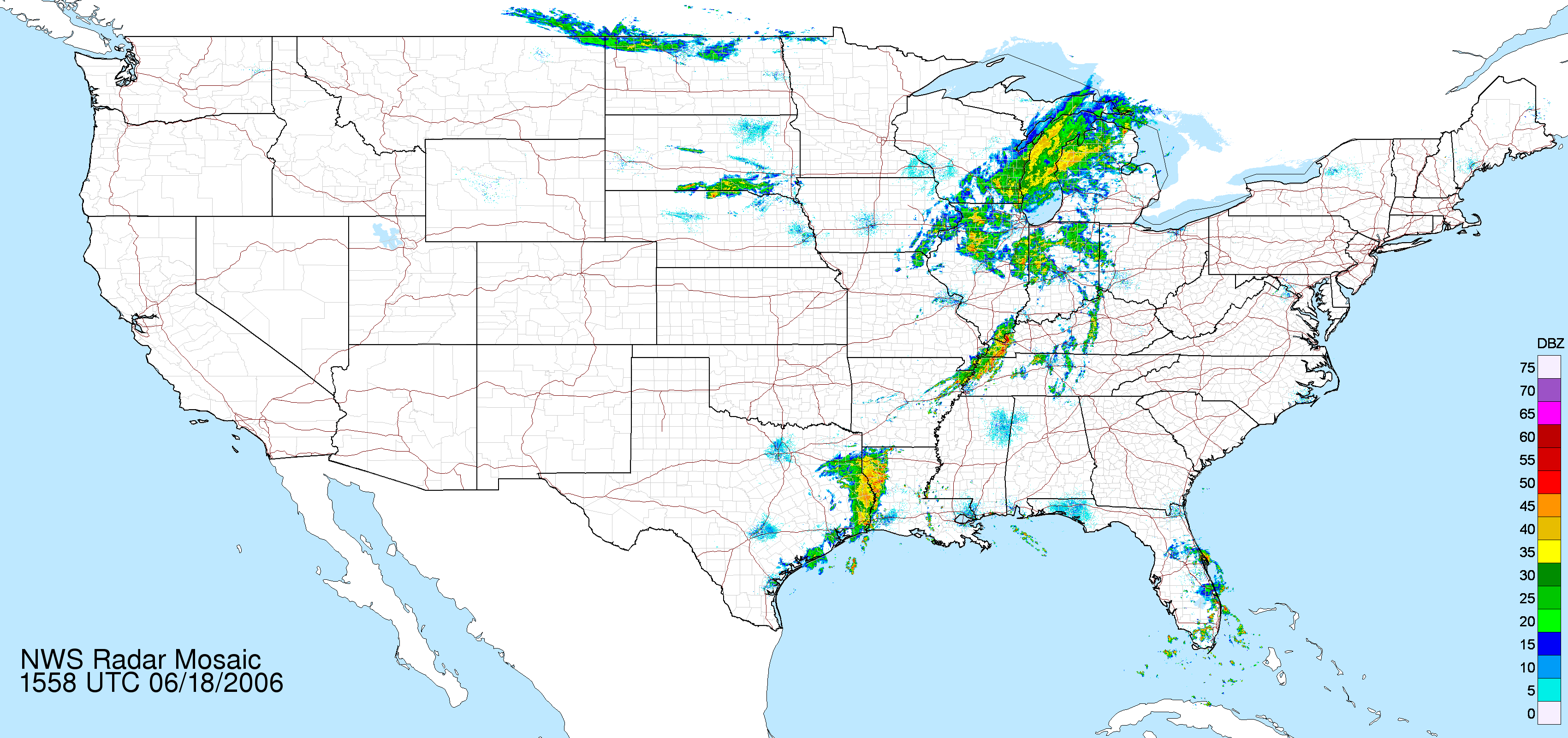
A NWS composite radar image of the Continental United States, composed of many regional radars

The WSR-88D Doppler weather radar system, also called NEXRAD, was developed by the National Weather Service during the mid-1980s, and fully deployed throughout the majority of the United States by 1997. There are 158 such radar sites in operation in the U.S., its various territorial possessions and selected overseas locations. This technology, because of its high resolution and ability to detect intra-cloud motions, is now the cornerstone of the agency's severe weather warning operations.

National Weather Service meteorologists use an advanced information processing, display and telecommunications system, the Advance Weather Interactive Processing System (AWIPS), to complete their work. These workstations allow them to easily view a multitude of weather and hydrologic information, as well as compose and disseminate products. The NWS Environmental Modeling Center was one of the early users of the ESMF common modeling infrastructure. The Global Forecast System (GFS) is one of the applications that is built on the framework.

In 2016, the NWS significantly increased the computational power of its supercomputers, spending $44 million on two new supercomputers from Cray and IBM. This was driven by relatively lower accuracy of NWS' Global Forecast System (GFS) numerical weather prediction model, compared to other global weather models. This was most notable in the GFS model incorrectly predicting Hurricane Sandy turning out to sea until four days before landfall; while the European Centre for Medium-Range Weather Forecasts' model predicted landfall correctly at seven days. The new supercomputers increased computational processing power from 776 teraflops to 5.78 petaflops.

== Organization ==
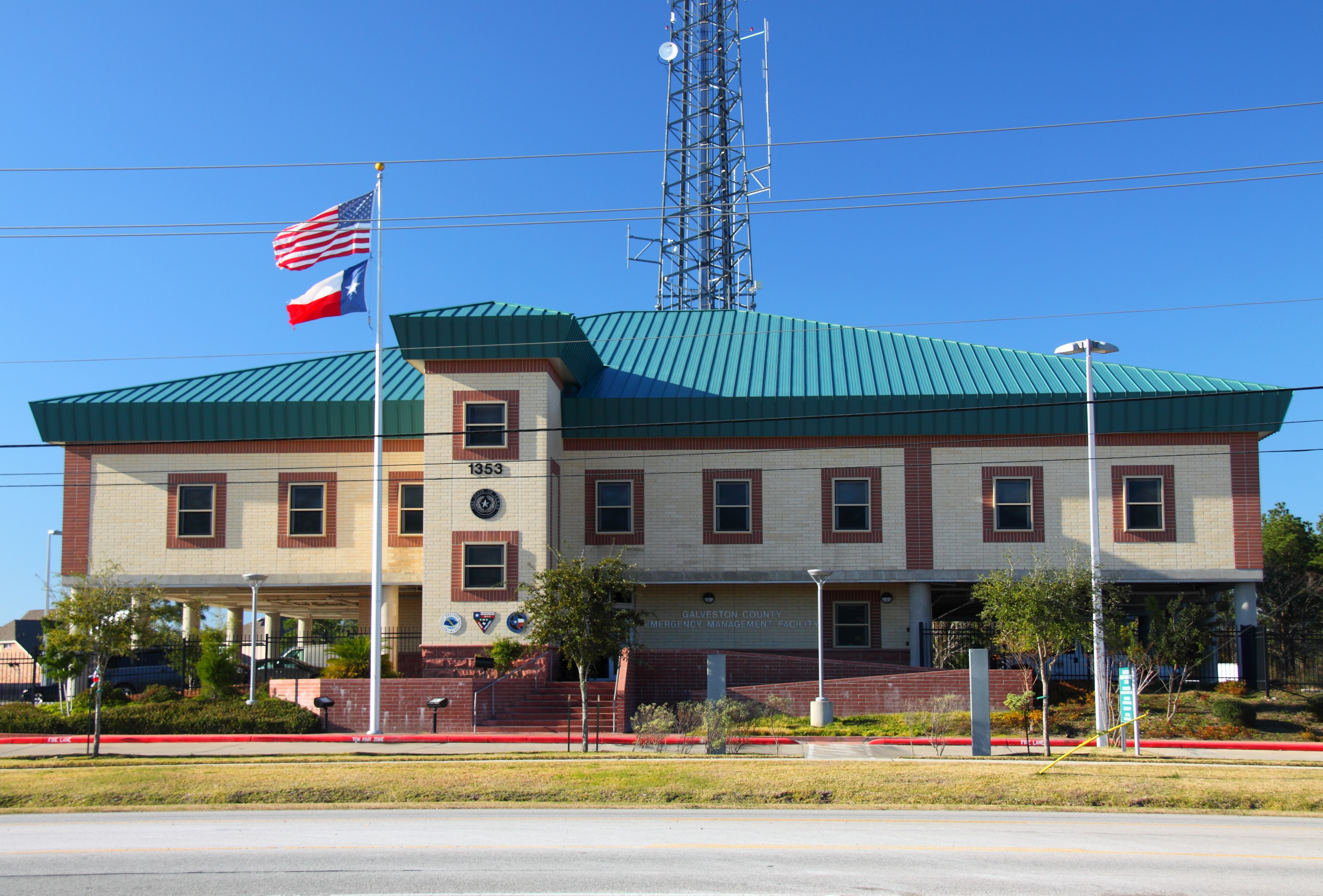
Specially designed hurricane-proof building constructed to house joint offices of the Houston-Galveston National Weather Service Forecast Office and the Galveston County Emergency Management Office

As of 2016, the National Weather Service was organized as follows

- Chief Information Officer
- National Centers for Environmental Prediction (NCEP)
  - Aviation Weather Center (AWC)
  - Climate Prediction Center (CPC)
  - Environmental Modeling Center (EMC)
  - Weather Prediction Center (WPC)
  - Ocean Prediction Center (OPC)
  - NCEP Central Operations
  - Space Weather Prediction Center (SWPC)
  - Storm Prediction Center (SPC)
  - National Hurricane Center (NHC)
    - Hurricane Specialist Unit (HSU)
    - Tropical Analysis and Forecast Branch (TAFB)
    - Technical Support Branch (TSB)
- Chief Financial Officer
- Operational Systems
- Hydrologic Development
- Science and Technology
  - Programs and Plans
  - Meteorological Development Laboratory (MDL)
- Climate, Water and Weather Services
- 6 Regions (Eastern, Central, Southern, Western, Alaska & Pacific)
  - 122 Weather Forecast Offices (WFOs)
  - 21 Center Weather Service Units (CWSU)
  - 13 River Forecast Centers (RFC)
  - Pacific Tsunami Warning Center (PTWC)
  - National Tsunami Warning Center (NTWC)
- Spaceflight Meteorology Group (SMG)

== Privatization and dismantling attempts ==
While respected as one of the premier weather organizations in the world, the National Weather Service has been perceived by some conservatives since the early 2000s as competing unfairly with the private sector. National Weather Service forecasts and data, being works of the federal government, are in the public domain and thus available to anyone for free under United States law. From time to time, the situation receives official review to ascertain if a leaner, more efficient approach may be had by some degree of privatization.

=== Aborted Byrne proposal, 1983 ===
In 1983, the Reagan administration and NOAA administrator John V. Byrne announced a proposal to sell all of the agency's weather satellites at auction with the intent to repurchase the weather data from private contractors that would acquire the satellites. Under the proposal, 30% of NOAA's workforce would be reviewed for potential layoffs, and certain specialty forecasts of agricultural and economic importance would be eliminated. NOAA also proposed outsourcing weather observation stations, NOAA Weather Radio, and computerized surface analysis to private companies. The proposal was met with negative reactions among the public, members of Congress, and consumer advocacy groups (including most notably, Ralph Nader), objecting to the possibility of weather information intended for the public domain being sold to private entities that would profit from the sale of the data. The proposal to sell the satellite network failed in a Congressional vote, while other aspects of the proposal to dismantle portions of NOAA's agencies were eventually scuttled.

=== Failed Santorum proposal, 2005 ===
In 2005, Pennsylvania Senator Rick Santorum introduced the National Weather Service Duties Act of 2005, a bill which would have prohibited the NWS from freely distributing weather data. The bill was widely criticized by users of the NWS's services, especially by emergency management officials relying on the National Weather Service for information during fires, flooding, or severe weather. Groups such as the Aircraft Owners and Pilots Association condemned the bill's restrictions on weather forecasting as threatening the safety of air traffic, noting that 40% of all aviation accidents are at least partially weather-related. The bill attracted no cosponsors, and died in committee during the 2005 Congressional session.

=== Second Trump administration ===
During the federal mass layoffs in 2025, probationary employees, who were easy to fire, received notices stating that they were "not fit for continued employment because your ability, knowledge and/or skills do not fit the agency's current needs". The companies chosen to assist the National Oceanic and Atmospheric Administration had ties to Trump officials and those who filled leadership positions at NOAA both advocated for and stood to benefit financially from the privatization of weather forecasting. The Brookings Institution described the firings as setting the stage for greater privatization and automation of the federal government, and Trump appointees had multiple conflicts of interest and financial ties to companies that would benefit as part of an effort to privatize government functions.

== Accuracy ==
Critics such as University of Washington professor Cliff Mass have claimed that NWS forecasts are not as accurate as they could be, and that this has resulted in inaccurate daily weather forecasts and dangerously bad predictions concerning the location and intensity of extreme weather events like blizzards and hurricanes. In 2016, the British Met Office, the European Centre for Medium-Range Weather Forecasts (ECMWF), and the Northwest Regional Modeling Consortium in Seattle have been cited as producing more accurate predictions in certain circumstances. According to critics, causes include:

- Lack of sufficient computing power to run simulations known to be better (including higher-resolution simulations and "ensemble" forecasts where multiple runs tweak variables slightly to detect low-confidence simulations)
- Not using techniques shown to improve accuracy by recent academic research
- Not assimilating data from all available sources, such as TAMDAR data from commercial airliners. (Due to budget cuts, this could not be purchased from Panasonic Weather Solutions on an ongoing basis.)
- Lack of updated equipment on weather satellites
- Lack of focus on a small number of high-quality models compared to the Met Office and the ECMWF Integrated Forecast System
- Organizational stovepiping and turf wars
- Resistance to change by powerful employee unions

The Next Generation Global Prediction System project at NWS aims to address some of these criticisms by running a unified high-quality model that takes advantage of more recent research results. In 2016, the NOAA announced to develop The Next Generation Global Prediction System.

== Directors ==
The following is a list of the organization leaders of the National Weather Service and its predecessors, the United States Weather Bureau and the U.S. Army Signal Service, Division of Telegrams and Reports for the Benefit of Commerce. The first heads of the weather service, beginning in 1870 under military control, had the title of Chief Signal Officer. Once the organization became a civil agency in 1891, this position became known as the chief of the Weather Bureau. With the renaming of the organization in 1970, it has been the director of the National Weather Service.

No.	Image	Name	Term start	Term end	Refs
Established as the U.S. Army Signal Service, Division of Telegrams and Reports for the Benefit of Commerce in 1870 and headed by the U.S. Army Chief Signal Officer
1		Albert J. Myer (Note: U.S. Army officer, head of the Army Signal Corp)	February 9, 1870	August 24, 1880 (Note: Died in office)	
acting		Richard C. Drum	August 24, 1880	December 15, 1880	
2		William Babcock Hazen	December 16, 1880 (Note: Hazen was nominated Dec. 6; confirmed by the Senate Dec. 15; and assumed the duties of chief signal officer Dec. 16)	January 16, 1887	
3		Adolphus Greely	March 3, 1887 (Note: Greely was appointed acting chief signal officer Dec. 2, 1886, after Hazen was granted a leave of absence due to poor health. Greely was officially nominated for the post February 15, 1887, and confirmed by the Senate March 3, 1887.)	June 30, 1891	
Renamed United States Weather Bureau in 1891, transferred to the USDA and headed by the chief of the Weather Bureau
4		Mark Walrod Harrington (Note: Harrington becomes the first chief of the Weather Bureau.)	July 1, 1891	June 29, 1895	
acting		James R. Cook	July 1, 1895	July 4, 1895	
5		Willis Luther Moore	July 4, 1895	April 16, 1913	
acting		Henry E. Williams (Note: Author of The Weather Bureau (1915))	April 17, 1913	August 4, 1913	
6		Charles F. Marvin	August 4, 1913	January 30, 1934	
7		Willis Ray Gregg	January 31, 1934	September 14, 1938	
acting		Charles C. Clark	September 14, 1938	December 14, 1938	
acting		Francis Reichelderfer	December 14, 1938	January 1, 1939	
8		Francis Reichelderfer	January 1, 1939	September 30, 1963	
9		Robert M. White	October 1, 1963	July 13, 1965	
acting		George Cressman (Note: Cressman served in an acting capacity until September 1, 1965. He was the last chief of the Weather Bureau and the first director of the National Weather Service.)	July 13, 1965	September 1, 1965	
10		George Cressman	September 1, 1965	January 15, 1979	
Renamed National Weather Service in 1970, transferred to NOAA, and headed by the director of the National Weather Service.
11		Richard E. Hallgren	February 12, 1979	March 27, 1988	
12		Elbert W. "Joe" Friday, Jr.	March 28, 1988	June 27, 1997	
acting		Robert S. Winokur	June 28, 1997	February 25, 1998	
13		John J. "Jack" Kelly, Jr.	February 26, 1998	January 8, 2004	
14		David L. Johnson	January 9, 2004	June 30, 2007	
acting		Mary Glackin	July 1, 2007	September 1, 2007	
15		John L. "Jack" Hayes	September 2, 2007	May 25, 2012	
acting		Laura Furgione	May 26, 2012	February 9, 2013	
16		Louis Uccellini	February 10, 2013	January 1, 2022	
acting		Mary C. Erickson	January 2, 2022	June 6, 2022	
17		Ken Graham	June 7, 2022	present	

Table notes:

== See also ==
- Reginald Fessenden – known for proving the practicality of using a network of coastal radio stations to transmit weather information
- Meteorological Service of Canada – a Canadian weather forecasting agency operated under Environment Canada, founded in 1876
- NOAA's Environmental Real-time Observation Network
- Radar Operations Center
