= George Cressman =

American meteorologist (1919–2008)

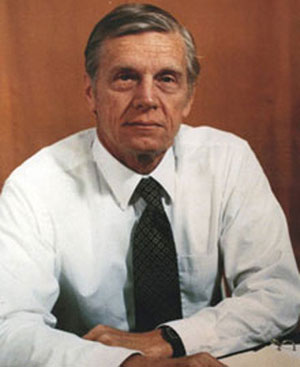
- Born: October 7, 1919; West Chester
- Died: April 17, 2008 (aged 88); Rockville
- Alma mater: University of Chicago; Pennsylvania State University
- Occupation: Meteorologist
- Employer: United States Weather Bureau; National Weather Service
- Awards: International Meteorological Organization Prize (1977)
- Position held: director (1965–1979)

George Parmley Cressman (Oct. 7, 1919 – April 17, 2008) was the National Weather Service director who applied computers to meteorology and helped to change weather forecasting into a codified science. In the 1950s, Dr. Cressman was responsible for developing the first program to accurately and reliably forecast the weather using a computer. The method was called the “Cressman Analysis” or “Cressman Method” and changed forecasting methods and allowed meteorologists to develop numerical weather prediction. He was the director of the Weather Service from 1965 to 1979.

== Biography ==
George Cressman was born on October 7, 1919, in West Chester, Pennsylvania. As a boy, he got interested in weather and after his B. SC. at Pennsylvania State University, he enrolled during WWII in a military course of meteorology given at New York University to serve as a forecaster with the United States Army Air Forces. By January 1943, he was teaching meteorology to military students at the University of Chicago under the tutelage of Carl-Gustaf Rossby.

After the war, George Cressman joined the U.S. Weather Bureau and served at remote weather stations before receiving his doctorate from the University of Chicago in 1949. Switching back to the Air Force's central weather command at Andrews Air Force Base, he worked on improving weather predictions in particular for atomic bomb tests in the Nevada desert of the 1950's. In 1954, Dr. Cressman began to apply the new computer technology to meteorology as the director of the National Meteorological Center, a joint military and civilian forecasting unit at the time, and soon after the US Weather Bureau used "Cressman Method", for computer-generated forecasts.

In the early 1960's, Dr. Cressman pushed to share weather data with the Soviet Union. He became director of the Weather Bureau in 1965, expanding weather radar and local office networks across the country. He retired in 1979 but continued to work as a consultant to weather services in China, Spain and Brazil. He died April 17, 2008 at a long care facility in Rockville, Maryland. He had Alzheimer's disease.

== Notoriety ==
George Cressman was president of the American Meteorological Society in 1978 and received the International Meteorological Organization Prize in 1977.
