= Ken Graham =

American meteorologist

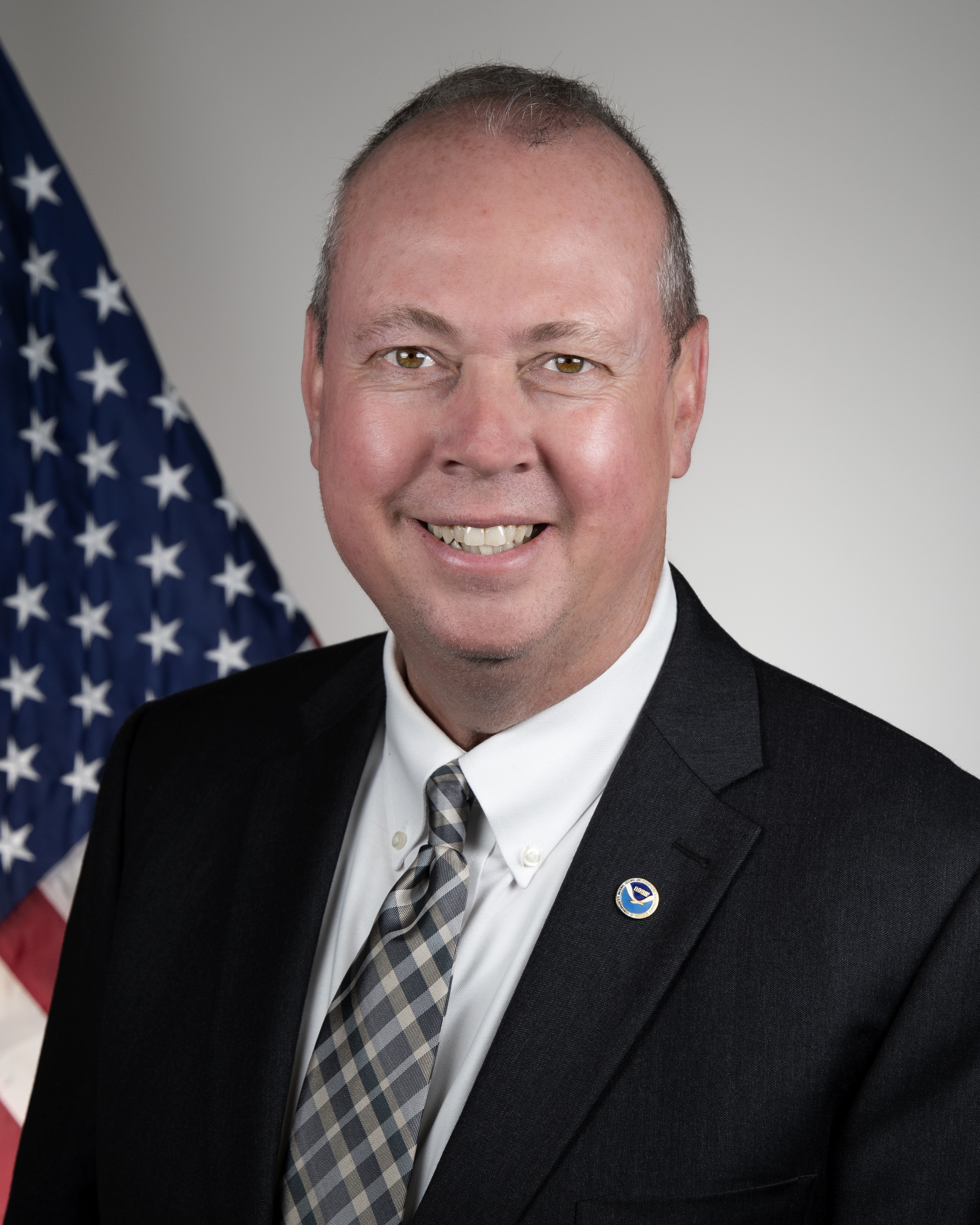
- Official portrait

Director of the National Weather Service
- Incumbent
- Assumed office June 7, 2022
- Preceded by: Louis Uccellini

Personal details
- Born: Phoenix, Arizona, U.S.
- Children: 3
- Education: University of Arizona; Mississippi State University
- Occupation: Meteorologist

Kenneth Graham is an American meteorologist and the director of the National Weather Service. Graham previously was the director of the National Hurricane Center from 2018 to 2022. Prior to that, he was the lead meteorologist for the National Weather Service office in New Orleans / Baton Rouge.

== Early life and education ==
Graham received a Bachelor degree in Atmospheric Sciences at the University of Arizona and attended Mississippi State University, where he earned a Master's degree in Geosciences.

== Career ==
Graham began his career as a television meteorologist for CBS and an agricultural meteorologist for Mississippi Network Radio. Graham joined the National Oceanic and Atmospheric Administration (NOAA) in 1994, working as a broadcast meteorologist in Columbus, Mississippi. He then moved around to different offices in the southern United States, eventually he headed the systems operations division of the NWS Southern Region in Fort Worth, Texas, where he led the agency to make important repairs in New Orleans after Hurricane Katrina.

Following Hurricane Katrina, Graham moved to Washington D.C., becoming chief of meteorological services and briefing congressional committees. Graham also participated in recovery efforts in Louisiana and Texas after hurricanes Gustav and Ike; he moved back to become Meteorologist-in-Charge (MIC) of the NWS office in New Orleans soon before those hurricanes hit. During the Deepwater Horizon oil spill disaster in 2010, Graham, as MIC, spearheaded the cooperative intergovernmental engagement effort and issued more than 4,300 spot forecasts for areas affected by the spill.

Graham was selected by NOAA to be the new director of the National Hurricane Center in early 2018. He began the role on April 1 that year. Graham was named the Director of the National Weather Service on June 7, 2022.

== Awards and honors ==
In 2005, he won a Bronze medal from the United States Department of Commerce due to his office's actions during Hurricane Katrina. In 2008, while Meteorologist-in-Charge of the NWS office in Baton Rouge, Graham and his office received the Department of Commerce Bronze medal for innovative services during hurricanes Gustav and Ike. Graham also won the National Weather Association’s Operational Meteorology Award for his office's response to the Deepwater Horizon spill and was included as one of the recipients of the Department of Commerce Gold Medal Award for Decision Support Service that was presented to NOAA. Ken received the National Weather Museum’s Weather Hero Award for 2010. In addition, Graham was given the Louisiana Governor's Emergency Service Award in 2014, Weatherperson of the Year in 2022, and the Robert and Joanne Simpson Hurricane Award in 2023.

Graham is a member of the American Meteorological Society, National Weather Association, and the International Association of Emergency Managers. He is also a licensed amateur radio operator. Graham spoke at the Natural Disaster Expo that took place at the Miami Beach Convention Center in February 2021.
