= Weather, Climate, and Society =

Academic journal by American Meteorological Society

- Discipline: American Meteorological Society academic, Sociology, Meteorology, Climatology, Climate change
- Language: English
- Edited by: Henry Huntington

Publication details
- History: 2009–present
- Publisher: American Meteorological Society (United States of America)
- Frequency: Quarterly
- Open access: Delayed, 1 year
- Impact factor: 2.746 (2020)

Standard abbreviations
- ISO 4: Weather Clim. Soc.

Indexing
- ISSN: 1948-8327 (print); 1948-8335 (web)

Links
- Journal homepage; online access

Weather, Climate, and Society (WCAS) is a peer-reviewed scientific journal published quarterly by the American Meteorological Society.

WCAS publishes research that encompasses economics, policy analysis, political science, history, and institutional, social, and behavioral scholarship relating to weather and climate, including climate change. Contributions must include original social science research, evidence-based analysis, and relevance to the interactions of weather and climate with society.

The governing AMS Council has eliminated page charges for papers submitted to WCAS.

== See also ==
- List of scientific journals in earth and atmospheric sciences
