= Charles F. Marvin =

American meteorologist (1858–1943)

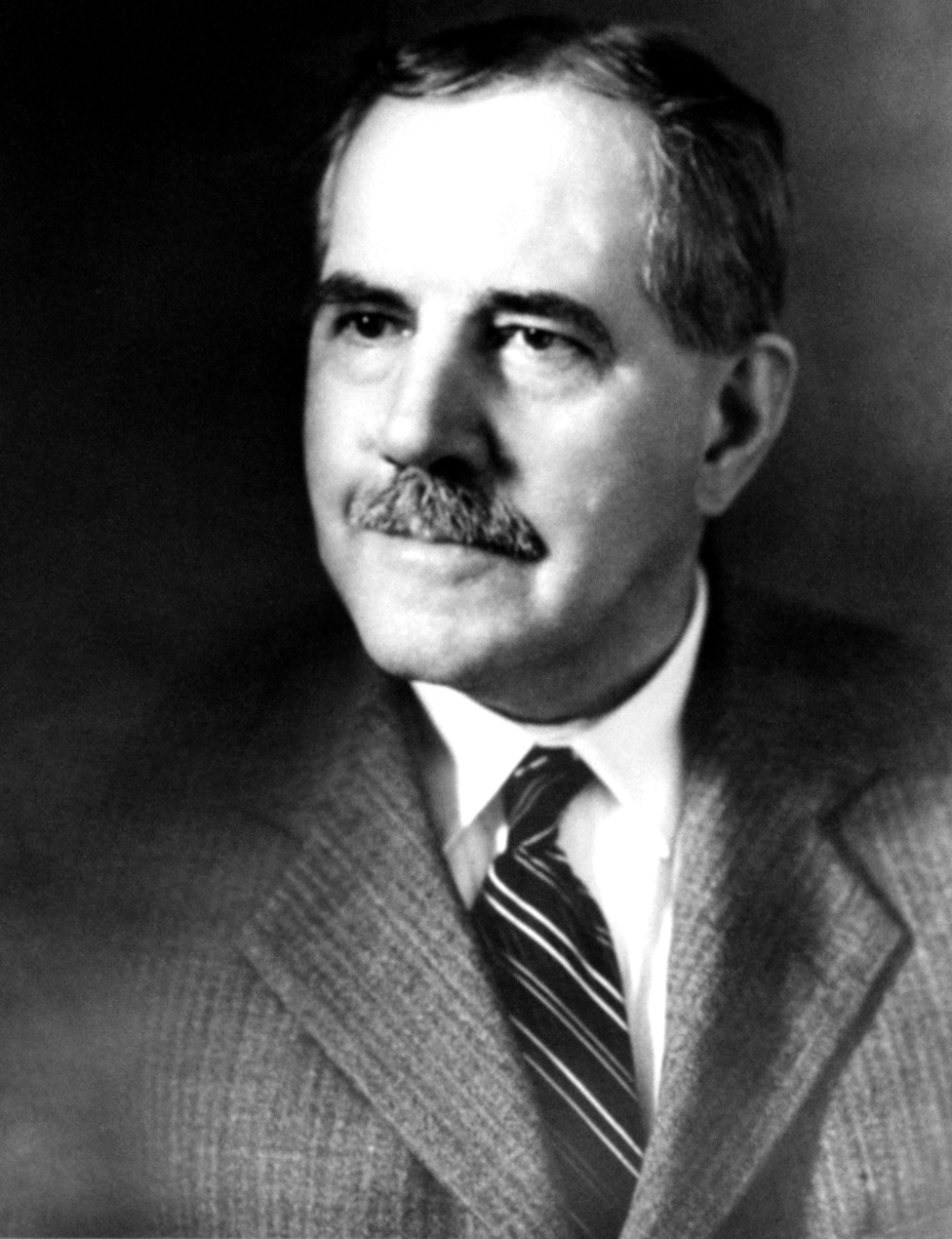
- Professor Charles F. Marvin, during his tenure as head of the Weather Bureau
- Born: October 7, 1858; Putnam, Ohio
- Died: June 5, 1943 (aged 84); Washington, D.C.
- Education: Michigan State University
- Scientific career
- Fields: meteorology
- Workplaces: United States Weather Bureau

Charles Frederick Marvin (October 7, 1858 – June 5, 1943) was an American meteorologist and chief of the United States Weather Bureau from 1913 – 1934.

== Biography ==
Marvin was born in Putnam, Ohio. He graduated from Michigan State University in 1883 and, on September 1, 1884, joined the civilian corps of the United States Army Signal Service (which at the time carried out the duties of the nation's first weather service) as a junior professor of meteorology. Following the transfer of the nation's weather service, by an Act of Congress, to the United States Department of Agriculture, on July 1, 1891, Marvin joined the newly created Weather Bureau as a professor of meteorology. All the men and duties relating to weather were transferred from the War Department. In 1913, upon the recommendation of the National Academy of Sciences, President Woodrow Wilson appointed Marvin chief of the Weather Bureau.

Marvin conducted important experiments for determining the amount of moisture in the air, invented instruments for automatically measuring and recording rainfall, snowfall, etc., and produced other advancements when man first began the employment of powered aircraft.

Marvin wrote numerous pamphlets and papers published by the Weather Bureau. He contributed to the New International Encyclopedia.

Marvin was elected to the American Philosophical Society in 1916.

He died at Doctors Hospital, Washington, D.C., after a month's illness.
