= Smagorinsky =

Smagorinsky is a surname. Notable people with the surname include:

- Joseph Smagorinsky (1924–2005), American meteorologist
- Margaret Smagorinsky (1915–2011), American statistician, computer programmer, and weather technologist
- Peter Smagorinsky, American educator
