= Bhupendra Nath Goswami =

Indian meteorologist (born 1950)

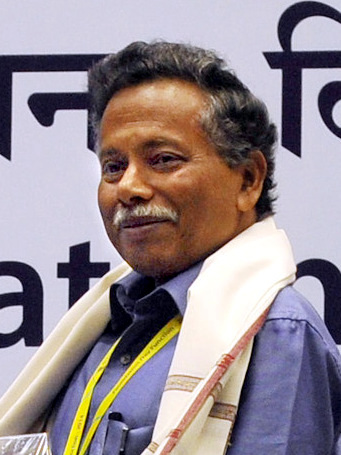
- Born: 1 August 1950 (age 76); Patbaushi, Barpeta district, Assam, India
- Education: Cotton College, Guwahati; Gauhati University; Physical Research Laboratory; Gujarat University; Cambridge–MIT Institute
- Known for: Studies on Indian monsoon dynamics
- Awards: 1994 PRL Hari Om Ashram Prerit Vikram Sarabhai Award; 1995 S. S. Bhatnagar Prize; 2008 INSA K. R. Ramanathan Medal; 2008 Kamal Kumari National Award; 2012 VASVIK Industrial Research Award; 2019 Assam State Science Award; MoES National Award in Atmospheric Science and Technology
- Scientific career
- Fields: Meteorology; Climatology
- Workplaces: IIT Delhi; Indian Institute of Science; University of Maryland; Geophysical Fluid Dynamics Laboratory; Indian Institute of Tropical Meteorology; NASA Goddard Space Flight Center
- Doctoral advisor: Bimla Buti
- Other academic advisors: Jule Charney (postdoc advisor)

Bhupendra Nath Goswami (born 1950) is an Indian meteorologist, climatologist, a former director of the Indian Institute of Tropical Meteorology (IITM). and a Pisharoty Chair Professor at the Indian Institute of Science Education and Research. He is known for his researches on the Indian monsoon dynamics and is an elected fellow of all the three major Indian science academies viz. Indian National Science Academy, Indian Academy of Sciences, and the National Academy of Sciences, India as well as The World Academy of Sciences. The Council of Scientific and Industrial Research, the apex agency of the Government of India for scientific research, awarded him the Shanti Swarup Bhatnagar Prize for Science and Technology, one of the highest Indian science awards for his contributions to Earth, Atmosphere, Ocean and Planetary Sciences in 1995. (Note: Long link - please select award year to see details)

== Biography ==
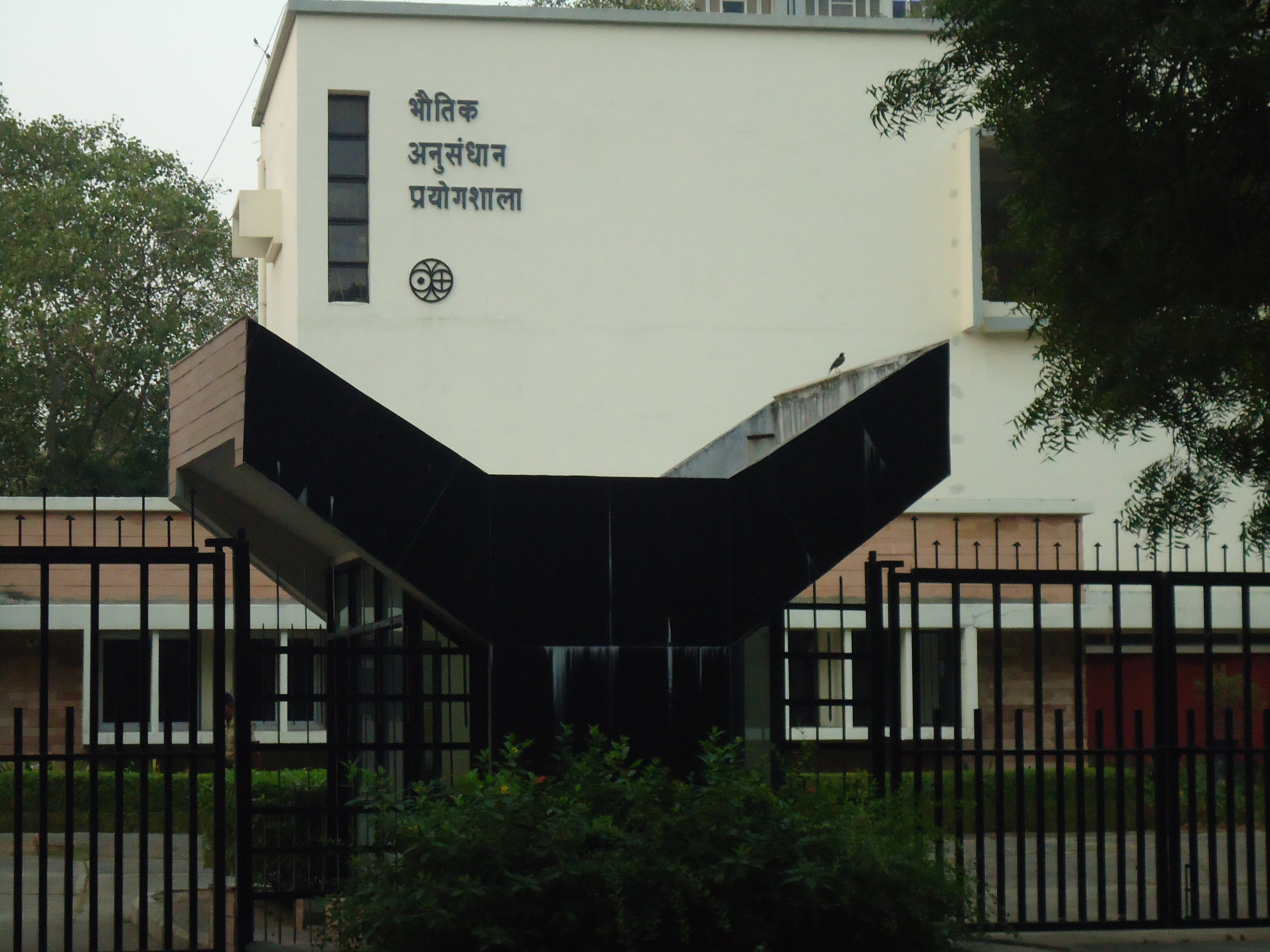
Physical Research Laboratory

Goswami was born on 1 August 1950 at Patbaushi, a small village in Barpeta district of the northeast Indian state of Assam, completed his early schooling at local schools in 1965 and graduated in science (BSc hons) from Cotton College, Guwahati in 1969. His master's degree in physics came from Guwahati University in 1971 after which he did his doctoral studies at Physical Research Laboratory (PRL) under the guidance of Bimla Buti to secure a PhD from the Gujarat University in 1976 for his thesis, Nonlinear waves in dispersive media and current driven instabilities in magnetoplasmas. After working for two years at PRL as a research associate, he moved to the US in 1978, where he did his post-doctoral studies at the laboratory of Jule Gregory Charney of Cambridge–MIT Institute during 1978–80. He continued in the US for three more years; the initial two years as a Resident Research Associate of National Research Council and the final year as a visiting scientist of Universities Space Research Association, both the tenures based at NASA Goddard Space Flight Center.

On his return to India, Goswami joined the Centre for Atmospheric Studies of the Indian Institute of Technology Delhi as a Senior Scientific Officer in 1983 but moved to the Indian Institute of Science in 1985 at their Centre for Atmospheric and Oceanic Sciences as an assistant professor. He served the centre until 2006, holding positions of a senior visiting research associate (1988–1989), associate professor (1992–1998), professor (1998–2005) and became the chairman of the Centre in August 2005. In between, he had various stints abroad; he served as a senior visiting research associate at the Center for Ocean-Land-Atmosphere Interactions (1988–1989) and Institute for Global Environment and Society (1998) of University of Maryland, went on deputation to the International Centre For Science and High Technology of the United Nations Industrial Development Organization (UNIDO) as a consultant from July to August 1992, and had three month-long assignments at the University of Princeton as a visiting research scientist, once in 1994 and twice in 1995. In June 2006, he was appointed as the director of the Indian Institute of Tropical Meteorology (IITM) and he stayed at the post until 2014 when he moved to the Indian Institute of Science Education and Research to hold the MoES Pisharoty Chair Professor at the Earth and Climate Science Department of the institute. He retired from service in November 2015.

Goswami is married to Bandana and the couple has two children, Lipika and Bikiran. The family lives in Pune.

== Legacy ==
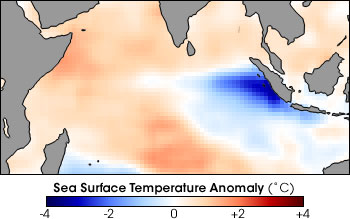
Indian Ocean Dipole

Goswami is known to have been the first to measure the predictability of tropical climate using coupled ocean-atmosphere system and his studies have widened the understanding of the monsoon dynamics. The principal areas of his studies have been geophysical fluid dynamics and tropical air-sea interactions and he identified a radiative-convective-dynamical feedback mechanism for generating the northward propagating 30-50 day mode, reported to be a first time find. He is also credited with the first time discovery that a convectively coupled gravest Rossby wave is responsible for the observed quasi-biweekly oscillation of monsoon and was a member of the first set of climatologists to discover the Indian Ocean Dipole along with N H Saji, P Vinayachandran and T yamagata which is a phenomenon where the temperatures alternatively oscillate between the western and eastern side of the Indian Ocean. His findings were first published in an article, A dipole mode in the tropical Indian Ocean, in Nature in 1999 and the article has a citation count of over 2405. His work on the monsoon intraseasonal oscillations for quantifying the seasonal mean monsoon assisted in the development of an extended range prediction system.

Goswami's studies have been detailed in several peer-reviewed articles; (Note: Please see Selected bibliography section) ResearchGate and Google Scholar, two online repositories of scientific articles, have listed 223 and 323 of them respectively. He has also mentored 10 scholars in their studies of which five were doctoral researchers. He headed the Monsoon Mission of India project constituted by the Ministry of Earth Sciences for improving the forecast of seasonal and intra-seasonal monsoon and has participated in many workshops on climatology including the Media Workshop on Climate Change organized by the Indian Institute of Tropical Meteorology in 2009. He was involved in several projects of various government agencies such as the Department of Science and Technology, National Disaster Management Authority, Science and Engineering Research Council and Indian Climate Research Programme and was associated with the World Climate Research Programme as a member of their National Committee (1995–97) and the CLIVAR Monsoon Panel (1999–2002). He sat in the science education panel (2004–06) and the council (2010–12) of the Indian Academy of Sciences and served as the secretary of the Indian Meteorological Society during 1996–2000 where he is a life member. He is also a member of the American Meteorological Society and has served as a member of the editorial boards of science journals such as Current Science, Mausam, International Journal of Climatology and Planet Earth.

== Awards and honors ==
Goswami received the Om Ashram Prerit Vikram Sarabhai Award of the Physical Research Laboratory in 1994 and the Council of Scientific and Industrial Research awarded him the Shanti Swarup Bhatnagar Prize, one of the highest Indian science awards in 1995. He received two major awards in 2008, the Kalpathi Ramakrishna Ramanathan Medal of the Indian National Science Academy and the Kamal Kumari National Award. He received the 24th Silver Jubilee Award of the Indian Institute of Tropical Meteorology in 2011 and the VASVIK Industrial Research Award in 2012. The Ministry of Earth Sciences awarded him the National Award in Atmospheric Science and Technology in 2014. The Indian Academy of Sciences elected Goswami as its fellow in 1996 and the other two major Indian science academies, the National Academy of Sciences, India and the Indian National Science Academy, followed suit in 2000 and 2003 respectively. He became a fellow of The World Academy of Sciences in 2009. He is a founding Fellow of the Physics Academy of the North East (FPANE). He has also delivered several award orations including the Professor K. R. Ramanathan Memorial lecture of 2014.

== Selected bibliography ==
- Chattopadhyay, R.; Sahai, A. K.; Goswami, Bhupendra Nath (2008). "Objective identification of nonlinear convectively coupled phases of monsoon intraseasonal oscillation: implications for prediction". Journal of the Atmospheric Sciences. 65 (5): 1549–1569. Bibcode:2008JAtS...65.1549C. doi:10.1175/2007JAS2474.1.
- Chattopadhyay, R.; Goswami, Bhupendra Nath; Sahai, A. K.; Fraedrich, K. (2009). "Role of stratiform rainfall in modifying the northward propagation of monsoon intraseasonal oscillation". Journal of Geophysical Research: Atmospheres. 114 (D19): D19114. Bibcode:2009JGRD..11419114C. doi:10.1029/2009JD011869.
- Mukhopadhyay, P.; Taraphdar, S.; Goswami, B. N.; Krishnakumar, K. (2010). "Indian summer monsoon precipitation climatology in a high-resolution regional climate model: impacts of convective parameterization on systematic biases" (PDF). Weather and Forecasting. 25 (2): 369–387. Bibcode:2010WtFor..25..369M. doi:10.1175/2009WAF2222320.1.
- Mujumdar, M.; Salunke, K.; Suryachandra Rao, A.; Ravichandran, M.; Goswami, B. N. (2011). "Diurnal cycle induced amplification of sea surface temperature Intraseasonal oscillations over the Bay of Bengal in summer monsoon season". IEEE Geoscience and Remote Sensing Letters. 82 (2): 206–210. Bibcode:2011IGRSL...8..206M. doi:10.1109/LGRS.2010.2060183. S2CID 18209765.
- Saha, Subodh Kumar; Halder, Subhadeep; Suryachandra Rao, A.; Goswami, B. N. (2012). "Modulation of ISOs by land-atmosphere feedback and contribution to the interannual variability of Indian summer monsoon". Journal of Geophysical Research: Atmospheres. 117 (D13): n/a. Bibcode:2012JGRD..11713101S. doi:10.1029/2011JD017291.

== See also ==
- Monsoon of South Asia
- Indian Monsoon Current
