= Climate of Cebu =

The Climate of Cebu is a tropical wet and dry climate. There are two seasons in Cebu - the wet season and the dry season. Cebu has three different climates, based on the distribution of rainfall, with the most prevalent ones being Am and Af and a very minor area of Aw. Based on temperature, the warmest months of the year are March through October; the winter monsoon brings cooler air from November to February. May is the warmest month, and January is the coolest.

All typically tropical temperature at sea level or low-elevation have a temperature range over the year is less than three degrees Celsius (5.4 degree F), and annual rainfall exceeds 1,500 millimeters (60 in).

== Climate types ==
There two methods for defining climate classification. Coronas Climate Types were described by 1920 by Coronas, who was the chief of Manila Observatory. He devised the classification which described all of the Philippines (only) into one of four climate types, depending mostly on distribution of rainfall.

In this classification all of Cebu takes two types:

- Type III contains a NW–SE line which includes Tuburan–Carmen and south. Seasons are not very pronounced, relatively dry from November to April, and wet during the rest of the year.
- Type IV with contains the line from Tabuelan–Catmon, and all northern Cebu and northern islands including Bantayan and Camotes. Rainfall is more or less evenly distributed throughout the year.

The other classification method is Köppen-Geiger type:

- Af ('Tropical rainforest') is the most prevalent type at 50% of Cebu. The southern area is as far north as Toledo and Minglanilla. Does not include Talisay nor Mactan, but does include Camotes islands. All 12 months have average precipitation of at least 60 millimetres (2.4 in) rainfall per month.
- Am ('Tropical monsoon') at 45%, is the most of northern Cebu and Bantayan. This type of climate results from the monsoon winds which change direction according to the seasons. This climate has a driest month with rainfall less than 60 millimetres (2.4 in) but more than 1/25 the total annual precipitation.
- Aw ('Tropical savanna') is less than 5% of Cebu, comprises just a small littoral area of Tuburan. It has a dry season, with the driest month having less than 60 millimetres (2.4 in) and less than 1/25 of the total annual precipitation.

Climate: Type III Köppen–Geiger Af
Santander
		Jan	Feb	Mar	Apr	May	Jun	Jul	Aug	Sep	Oct	Nov	Dec	Year
Average high	°C °F	30.1; 86.2	30.4; 86.7	31.3; 88.3	32.4; 90.3	32.7; 90.9	32.1; 89.8	31.6; 88.9	31.6; 88.9	31.6; 88.9	31.4; 88.5	31.2; 88.2	30.7; 87.3	31.4; 88.5
Average mean	°C °F	26.5; 79.7	26.5; 79.7	27.0; 80.6	28.0; 82.4	28.4; 83.1	27.8; 82.0	27.5; 81.5	27.4; 81.3	27.4; 81.3	27.3; 81.1	27.3; 81.1	27.1; 80.8	27.3; 81.1
Average low	°C °F	22.9; 73.2	22.7; 72.9	22.8; 73.0	23.6; 74.5	24.1; 75.4	23.6; 74.5	23.4; 74.1	23.3; 73.9	23.2; 73.8	23.3; 73.9	23.5; 74.3	23.5; 74.3	23.3; 73.9
Average rainfall	mm in	121; 4.8	71; 2.8	81; 3.2	60; 2.4	108; 4.3	137; 5.4	176; 6.9	136; 5.4	141; 5.6	195; 7.7	200; 7.9	153; 6.0	1,579; 62.2
climate-data.org March 2016
Climate: Type III Köppen–Geiger Aw
Tuburan
		Jan	Feb	Mar	Apr	May	Jun	Jul	Aug	Sep	Oct	Nov	Dec	Year
Average high	°C °F	29.9; 85.8	30.1; 86.2	31.2; 88.2	32.5; 90.5	33.1; 91.6	32.6; 90.7	32.1; 89.8	32.1; 89.8	31.9; 89.4	31.7; 89.1	31.1; 88.0	30.4; 86.7	31.6; 88.9
Average mean	°C °F	26.2; 79.2	26.3; 79.3	27.0; 80.6	28.1; 82.6	28.7; 83.7	28.4; 83.1	28.1; 82.6	28.1; 82.6	27.8; 82.0	27.7; 81.9	27.2; 81.0	26.7; 80.1	27.5; 81.5
Average low	°C °F	22.5; 72.5	22.5; 72.5	22.8; 73.0	23.8; 74.8	24.4; 75.9	24.2; 75.6	24.1; 75.4	24.1; 75.4	23.8; 74.8	23.7; 74.7	23.4; 74.1	23.1; 73.6	23.5; 74.3
Average rainfall	mm in	141; 5.6	81; 3.2	59; 2.3	38; 1.5	103; 4.1	138; 5.4	152; 6.0	96; 3.8	160; 6.3	213; 8.4	218; 8.6	145; 5.7	1,544; 60.8
climate-data.org March 2016
Climate: Type IV Köppen–Geiger Am
Daanbantayan
		Jan	Feb	Mar	Apr	May	Jun	Jul	Aug	Sep	Oct	Nov	Dec	Year
Average high	°C °F	30.4; 86.7	30.5; 86.9	31.6; 88.9	32.7; 90.9	33.5; 92.3	33.2; 91.8	32.7; 90.9	32.5; 90.5	32.3; 90.1	32.0; 89.6	31.5; 88.7	30.8; 87.4	32.0; 89.6
Average mean	°C °F	26.8; 80.2	26.8; 80.2	27.5; 81.5	28.5; 83.3	29.2; 84.6	29.1; 84.4	28.7; 83.7	28.5; 83.3	28.3; 82.9	28.1; 82.6	27.7; 81.9	27.4; 81.3	25.6; 78.1
Average low	°C °F	23.3; 73.9	23.2; 73.8	23.5; 74.3	24.3; 75.7	25.0; 77.0	25.0; 77.0	24.8; 76.6	24.6; 76.3	24.3; 75.7	24.2; 75.6	24.0; 75.2	24.0; 75.2	24.2; 75.6
Average rainfall	mm in	115; 4.5	68; 2.7	51; 2.0	60; 2.4	118; 4.6	198; 7.8	210; 8.3	189; 7.4	212; 8.3	233; 9.2	202; 8.0	125; 4.9	1,781; 70.1
climate-data.org March 2016

== Temperature ==
The climate is typically equatorial – the temperature range over the year is less than three degrees Celsius (-5.4 degrees F), and annual rainfall exceeds 1,500 millimeters (60 in). January to April inclusive are less wet than the other months.

The backbone of Cebu's hills and mountains can have temperatures lower than the coastal areas.

== Typhoons ==
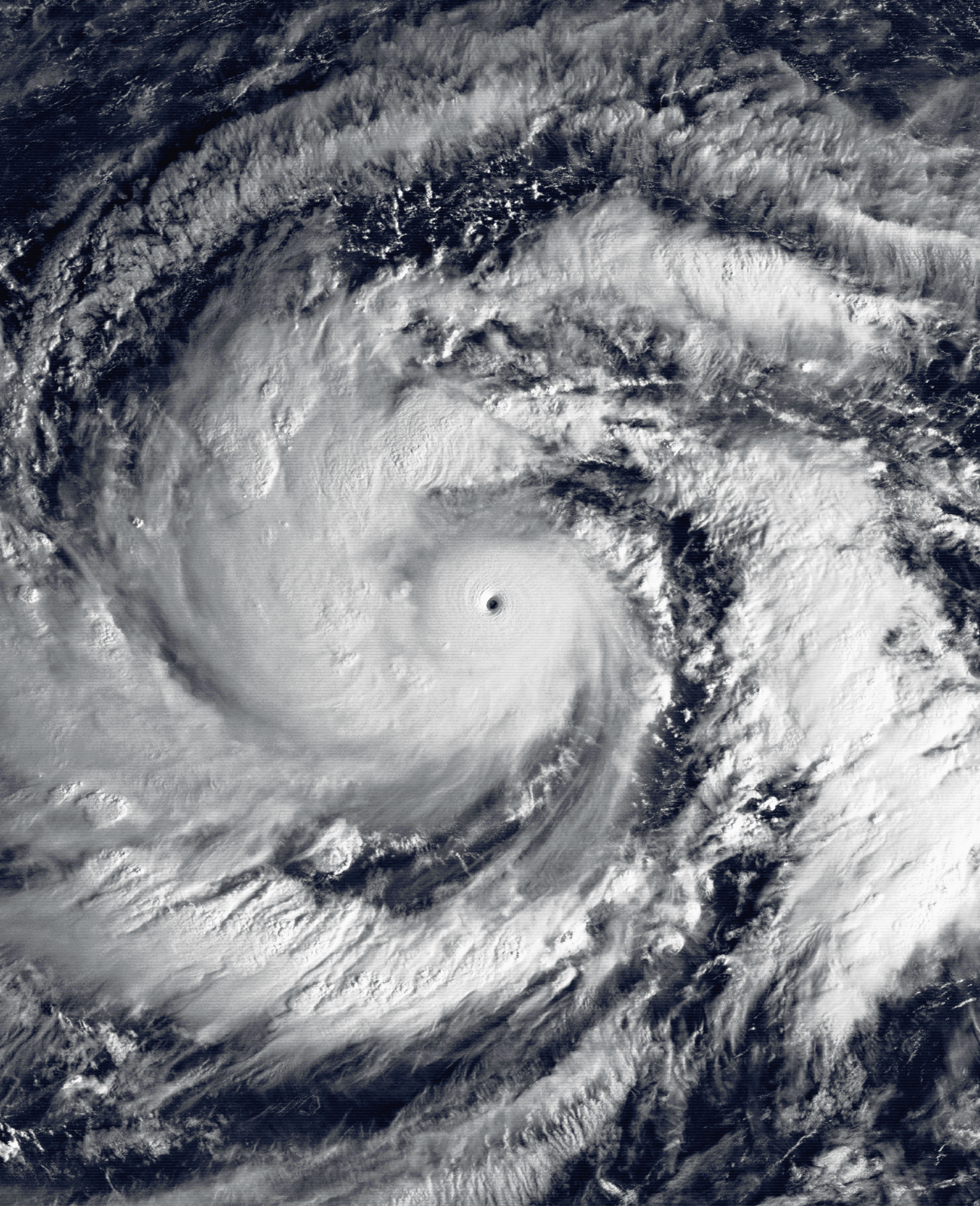
Typhoon Mike

The province of Cebu normally gets typhoons once a year or none. The typhoons that hit Cebu since the 2000s include Typhoon Rai (2021), Typhoon Utor (2006), Typhoon Hagibis (2007), Typhoon Fengshen (2008), Typhoon Bopha (2012) and Typhoon Kalmaegi (2025).

In November 2013, a powerful typhoon - Typhoon Haiyan – struck the province as a category 5 super typhoon. Northern towns of Cebu Province and Bantayan Island were the worst hit.

On December 16, 2021, Typhoon Rai's eyewall struck metro Cebu and made landfall over Carcar as a category 4.

In November 4, 2025, Typhoon Kalmaegi made landfall in the province as a category 1 typhoon. It made landfall over the municipality of Borbon and caused widespread flooding in many parts of Metro Cebu.

== See also ==
- Climate of the Philippines
