= Eady model =

Mathematical model of instability in the atmosphere

The Eady model is an atmospheric model for baroclinic instability first posed by British meteorologist Eric Eady in 1949 based on his PhD work at Imperial College London.

== Assumptions ==
The Eady model makes several assumptions about the state of the atmosphere. First, the model assumes the atmosphere is composed of fluid obeying quasi-geostrophic motion. Second, the model assumes a constant Coriolis parameter. The model also assumes a constant static stability parameter and that fluctuations in the density of the air are small (obeys the Boussinesq approximation). Structurally, the model is bounded by two flat layers or “rigid lids”: one layer representing the Earth's surface and the other the tropopause at fixed height H. To simplify numerical solutions, the model also assumes rigid walls longitudinally at x=-L and x=L. Lastly, the model assumes that there is constant shear in the zonal component of the mean state wind; the mean state zonal wind varies linearly with altitude.

== Equations ==
Starting with the quasi-geostrophic equations, applying the Eady model assumptions, and linearizing yields the linearized differential equations governing the time evolution of the state of the atmosphere in the Eady model:

${\overline \psi}= -\Lambda z y$

${\partial q' \over \partial t} + {\overline U} {\partial q' \over \partial x} =0$

${\partial T' \over \partial t} - v' f_0 \Lambda=0$

${\partial T' \over \partial t} +\Lambda H {\partial T' \over \partial x} - v' f_0 \Lambda=0$

where ψ denotes the streamfunction (which can be used to derive all other variables from quasi-geostrophic theory), z denotes altitude, y denotes latitude, q denotes the quasi-geostrophic potential vorticity, $\overline U$ denotes the mean zonal wind, T denotes the temperature, v denotes the meridional wind, $f_0$ denotes the Coriolis parameter, taken as a constant, Λ denotes the zonal wind shear, and H denotes the tropopause height. The third equation is valid at z = 0 and the fourth is valid at z = H.

== Results ==
The Eady model yields stable and unstable modes. Unstable modes have height, vorticity, vertical velocity, and several other atmospheric parameters with contours that tilt westward with height, though temperature contours tilt eastward with height for unstable modes. A poleward heat flux is observed in unstable modes, yielding the positive feedback necessary for cyclogenesis. Low pressure, high vorticity regions are then “stretched”, and high pressure and low vorticity regions are “squashed”, yielding higher and lower vorticity, respectively. In contrast, the opposite is observed in decaying modes: height, vorticity, etc. contours tilt eastward with height, except temperature which tilts westward with height. An equatorward heat flux is induced, decreasing potential vorticity and pressure anomalies and yielding cyclolysis. Making Fourier decompositions on the linearized Eady model equations and solving for the dispersion relation for the Eady model system allows one to solve for the growth rate of the modes (the imaginary component of the frequency). This yields a growth rate that increases with increasing wavenumber for small wavenumbers, reaches a maximum growth rate at roughly $\kappa L_R = 1.61$, where κ is the wavenumber and $L_R$ is the Rossby radius of deformation. As wavenumber increases from here, growth rate decreases, reaching zero growth rate around $\kappa L_R =2.4$. Beyond here, modes will not grow under the Eady model, so too large of wavenumbers (too small of scales) do not yield unstable modes in the Eady model.

== See also ==
- Quasi-geostrophic equations
- Charney Model
- Cyclogenesis
