= T. N. Krishnamurti =

Indian meteorologist

- Born: c. 1932
- Died: February 7, 2018
- Awards: Carl-Gustaf Rossby Research Medal; International Meteorological Organization Prize

Academic background
- Education: University of Chicago

Academic work
- Discipline: meteorology
- Institutions: Florida State University; University of California, Los Angeles
- Notable works: An Introduction to Global Spectral Modeling

Tiruvalam Natarajan Krishnamurti (c. 1932 – February 7, 2018) was an Indian meteorologist. He was a Professor emeritus at Florida State University, where prior to his retirement he was the Lawton Distinguished Professor of Meteorology.

== Career ==
Krishnamurti earned his doctorate in 1959 from the University of Chicago. Prior to joining the Florida State faculty, he taught at the University of California, Los Angeles.

In 2006, he co-authored An Introduction to Global Spectral Modeling, Second Edition, Springer, 317 pp. Textbook (with H. S. Bedi, V. M. Hardiker and L. Ramaswamy).

In 1985, the American Meteorological Society awarded him the Carl-Gustaf Rossby Research Medal.

He won the International Meteorological Organization Prize of the World Meteorological Organization in 1996.

In 2012 the Indian Meteorological Society gave him their Sir Gilbert Walker Gold Medal. A symposium in his honor was held in 2012 as part of the American Meteorological Society annual meeting in New Orleans.

Krishnamurti died on February 7, 2018.
