= Carlos Nobre (scientist) =

Brazilian scientist and meteorologist

- Nobre in 2023
- Born: Carlos Afonso Nobre; March 27, 1951 (age 75); São Paulo, Brazil
- Occupations: Scientist, Meteorologist
- Notable work: Large Scale Biosphere-Atmosphere Experiment in the Amazon (LBA); Anglo-Brazilian Experiment of Amazon Climate Observations (ABRACOS)

Carlos Afonso Nobre (born March 27, 1951) is a Brazilian scientist and meteorologist who is mainly highlighted in global warming-related studies. Nobre spearheaded the multi-disciplinary, multinational Large-Scale Biosphere-Atmosphere Experiment in Amazonia, a program noted to have “revolutionized understanding of the Amazon rainforest and its role in the Earth system.” He is also a Co-Chair of the Science Panel for the Amazon.

== Education ==
Nobre graduated in Electronic Engineering from the Instituto Tecnológico de Aeronáutica in 1974, and began working in Manaus at the Instituto Nacional de Pesquisas da Amazônia (INPA) the following year. He earned a Ph.D. in Meteorology at the Massachusetts Institute of Technology and studied Dynamic Meteorology of the Tropical Region with Jule Charney and Jagadish Shukla, pioneers in the construction of climate models, until 1982.

== Biography ==
Nobre returned to his birth city—São Paulo, Brazil—after receiving his Ph.D. Today he is a senior scientist at INPA but would visit abroad other times during research seasons. He began his research in 1988 as a visiting researcher at the University of Maryland, which would be recognized as pioneers in the analysis of the impacts of deforestation on the climate and posited the possibility of the Amazon becoming a savannah as a result of global warming, with potential mass extinction at the regional level. He worked in the coordination of large scientific projects in the Amazon and highlighted the Anglo-Brazilian Experiment of Amazon Climate Observations (ABRACOS) from 1990 to 1996, and the Large Scale Biosphere-Atmosphere Experiment in the Amazon (LBA) from 1993 to 2000. As of June 2025, Nobre is a senior scientist at the University of São Paulo's Institute for Advanced Studies. Nobre suggested 70% of the Amazon rainforest could be lost to savanna in a 2025 Guardian interview.
