= Joseph Pedlosky =

American physical oceanographer (born 1938)

- Born: April 7, 1938 (age 88)
- Education: Massachusetts Institute of Technology
- Scientific career
- Fields: Oceanography, fluid dynamics
- Workplaces: Woods Hole Oceanographic Institution, Massachusetts Institute of Technology, University of Chicago
- Thesis: The stability of currents in the atmosphere and the ocean (1963)
- Doctoral advisor: Jule Charney
- Website: http://www.whoi.edu/profile.do?id=jpedlosky

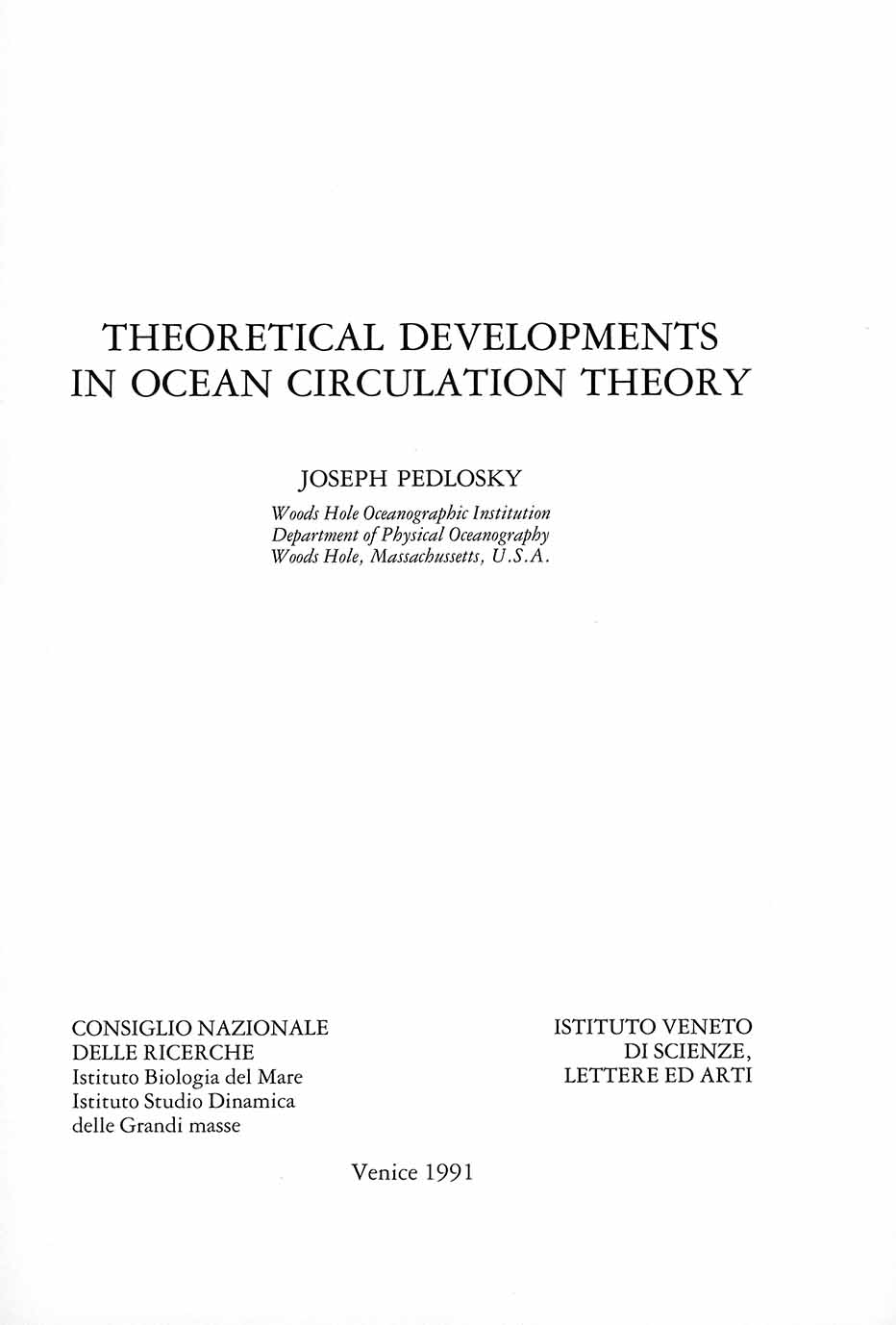
Theoretical developments in ocean circulation theory, 1991

Joseph Pedlosky (born April 7, 1938) is an American physical oceanographer. He is a scientist emeritus at the Woods Hole Oceanographic Institution. Pedlosky was elected to the United States National Academy of Sciences in 1985. He is the author of the textbooks Geophysical Fluid Dynamics, Ocean Circulation Theory, and Waves in the Ocean and Atmosphere: Introduction to Wave Dynamics.

== Biography ==
Pedlosky grew up in Paterson, New Jersey. He completed his Ph.D. in 1963 under the supervision of Jule Charney at MIT.

In 1966, as a young assistant professor at MIT, he refused to sign the Massachusetts Teachers' Oath ultimately bringing the case to the state supreme court. The Massachusetts Supreme Judicial Court invalidated the legislation in 1967 in its ruling Pedlosky v. Massachusetts Institute of Technology.

== Research ==
Pedlosky has made fundamental contributions in the study of baroclinic instability and the thermal structure of the ocean, particularly the oceanic thermocline.

== Awards and honors ==
- 1970: Clarence Leroy Meisinger Award, American Meteorological Society
- 1981: Fellow of the American Meteorological Society
- 1985: Elected to the United States National Academy of Sciences
- 1986: Fellow of the American Geophysical Union

1996 Elected to American Academy of Arts and Sciences

- 1997: Fellow of the American Association for Advancement of Science
- 2005: Sverdrup Gold Medal, American Meteorological Society
- 2009: Bernard Haurwitz Award, American Meteorological Society
- 2011: Maurice Ewing Medal, American Geophysical Union

== Works ==
- Theoretical developments in ocean circulation theory. Venezia: Istituto veneto di scienze lettere ed arti. 1991.
