= International Meteorological Organization Prize =

Prize established in 1956

The International Meteorological Organization Prize is awarded annually by the World Meteorological Organization (WMO) for outstanding contributions in the field of meteorology and, since 1971, the field of operational hydrology.

The prize, established in 1956, consists of a 14-carat gold medal 57mm in diameter, displaying the official WMO emblem and on the reverse the Latin inscription Pro singulari erga scientiam meteorologicam merito (for outstanding work on the science of meteorology), together with a cash award of 10,000 Swiss Francs. It was named to commemorate the International Meteorological Organization, the predecessor organisation of the current World Meteorological Organization.

== Prizewinners ==
Source: WMO

| 2024 | Gerhard Adrian |
| 2023 | Tim Palmer |
| 2022 | Sue Barrell |
| 2021 | In-Sik Kang |
| 2020 | David Grimes |
| 2019 | Sergej Zilitinkevich |
| 2018 | Antonio Divino Moura |
| 2017 | Gordon McBean |
| 2016 | Zeng Qing-Cun |
| 2015 | Julia Slingo |
| 2014 | Alexander Bedritsky |
| 2013 | Tillmann Mohr |
| 2012 | Zaviša Janjić |
| 2011 | Aksel C. Wiin-Nielsen |
| 2010 | Taroh Matsuno |
| 2009 | Eugenia Kalnay |
| 2008 | Qin Dahe |
| 2007 | Jagadish Shukla |
| 2006 | Lennart Bengtsson |
| 2005 | John Zillman |
| 2004 | Bennert Machenhauer |
| 2003 | Ye Duzheng |
| 2002 | Joanne Simpson |
| 2001 | Mohammad Hassan Ganji |
| 2000 | Edward Norton Lorenz |
| 1999 | James Dooge |
| 1998 | John T. Houghton |
| 1997 | Mariano Estoque |
| 1996 | T.N. Krishnamurti |
| 1995 | Roman Kintanar |
| 1994 | James P. Bruce |
| 1993 | Verner E. Suomi |
| 1992 | Yuri Izrael |
| 1991 | Ragnar Fjørtoft |
| 1990 | Richard E. Hallgren |
| 1989 | Pisharoth Rama Pisharoty |
| 1988 | F. Kenneth Hare |
| 1987 | Mikhail Ivanovich Budyko |
| 1986 | Hermann Flohn |
| 1985 | David Arthur Davies |
| 1984 | Thomas F. Malone |
| 1983 | Muhamed F. Taha and J.J. Burgos |
| 1982 | William James Gibbs |
| 1981 | Bert Bolin |
| 1980 | Robert M. White |
| 1979 | Helmut Landsberg |
| 1978 | Alf.E.G.E. Nyberg |
| 1977 | George P. Cressman |
| 1976 | E.K. Fedorov |
| 1975 | Warren L. Godson |
| 1974 | Joseph Smagorinsky |
| 1973 | Charles Henry Brian Priestley and John S. Sawyer |
| 1972 | Victor Antonovich Bugaev |
| 1971 | Jule G. Charney |
| 1970 | Richard Th. A. Scherhag |
| 1969 | Erik Palmén |
| 1968 | Graham Sutton |
| 1967 | Kirill Y. Kondratyev |
| 1966 | Tor Bergeron |
| 1965 | Sverre Petterssen |
| 1964 | Francis Reichelderfer |
| 1963 | Reginald Sutcliffe |
| 1962 | Anders Knutsson Ångström |
| 1961 | K.R. Ramanathan |
| 1960 | Jacques van Mieghem |
| 1959 | Jacob Bjerknes |
| 1958 | Ernest Gold |
| 1957 | Carl-Gustaf Arvid Rossby |
| 1956 | Hans Theodor Hesselberg |

== See also ==
- List of oceanography awards
- List of meteorology awards
- List of prizes named after people
- List of prizes known as the Nobel of a field
