= Jule Gregory Charney =

US meteorologist

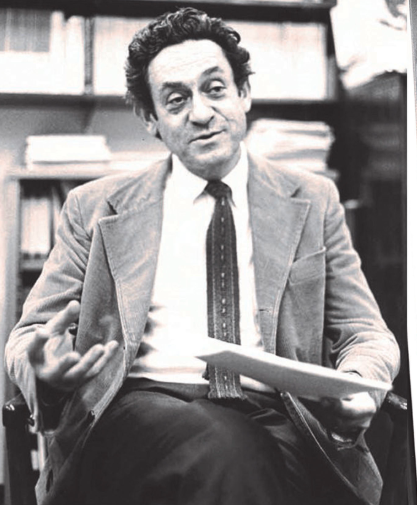
- Born: January 1, 1917; San Francisco, California, United States
- Died: June 16, 1981 (aged 64); Boston, Massachusetts, United States
- Education: UCLA
- Awards: Guggenheim Fellowship; Carl-Gustaf Rossby Research Medal; International Meteorological Organization Prize; William Bowie Medal
- Scientific career
- Fields: Meteorology
- Workplaces: Massachusetts Institute of Technology
- Doctoral advisor: Jørgen Holmboe
- Doctoral students: Conway B. Leovy (1963); Joseph Pedlosky (1963); James R. Holton (1964); Isidoro Orlanski (1967); Eugenia Kalnay (1971); Mark Cane (1975); Jagadish Shukla (1976); Inez Fung (1977); Kerry Emanuel (1978); Carlos Nobre (1983; advised by Jagadish Shukla and Peter Stone after Charney's death); Ted Shepherd (1984; advised by Peter Rhines after Charney's death)
- Other notable students: Bhupendra Nath Goswami (postdoc)

Jule Gregory Charney (January 1, 1917 – June 16, 1981) was an American meteorologist who played an important role in developing numerical weather prediction and increasing understanding of the general circulation of the atmosphere by devising a series of increasingly sophisticated mathematical models of the atmosphere. His work was the driving force behind many national and international weather initiatives and programs.

Considered the father of modern dynamical meteorology, Charney is credited with having "guided the postwar evolution of modern meteorology more than any other living figure". Charney's work also influenced that of his close colleague Edward Lorenz, who explored the limitations of predictability and was a pioneer of the field of chaos theory.

== Biography ==
Charney was born in San Francisco, California, on January 1, 1917, to Jewish-Russian immigrants Ely Charney and Stella Littman, tailors in the garment industry. Charney spent most of his early life in California. After a 20-month battle with cancer, he died in Boston at the Sidney Farber Cancer Institute at the age of 64.

== Education ==
Charney earned his undergraduate and graduate degrees at UCLA, culminating in a Ph.D. in physics in 1946.

His Ph.D. dissertation, titled “The Dynamics of Long Waves in a Baroclinic Westerly Current” comprised the entire October 1947 issue of the Journal of Meteorology. The paper was influential because it emphasized the influence of “long waves” in the upper atmosphere on the behavior of the entire atmosphere rather than the more traditional emphasis on the polar front and also provided a way of analyzing perturbations along these waves that was both physically insightful and mathematically rigorous.

== Career and legacy ==
Charney began his career at his alma mater, UCLA, as an instructor in physics and meteorology from 1941 to 1946. In 1946, Charney became a research associate at the University of Chicago under Carl-Gustav Rossby, a Swedish-born American meteorologist whose theories of large-scale air movements helped revolutionize meteorology.

From 1947 to 1948, Charney held a National Research Council postgraduate fellowship at the University of Oslo in Norway. During this year, he developed a technique known as the “quasi-geostrophic approximation” for calculating the large-scale motions of planetary-scale waves.

Charney's quasi-geostrophic vorticity equations allowed for concise mathematical description of large-scale atmospheric and oceanic circulations, enabling future numerical weather prediction work.

=== Numerical weather prediction ===
In 1948, Charney joined the Institute for Advanced Study (IAS) in Princeton, New Jersey, to explore the feasibility of applying digital computers to weather prediction as head of the Meteorological Research Group. Together with noted mathematician John von Neumann, Charney helped pioneer the use of computers and numerical techniques to improve weather forecasting, and played a leading role in efforts to integrate sea–air exchanges of energy and moisture into the study of climate.

This collective work paved the way for the founding of NOAA's Geophysical Fluid Dynamics Laboratory. In 1954, Charney helped create the Joint Numerical Weather Prediction Unit, a collaboration between the U.S. Weather Bureau, Air Force, and Navy.

Charney would later serve as a member of the Committee on Atmospheric Sciences of the National Academy of Sciences and as chairman of the academy's Committee on International Meteorological Cooperation. In those roles, he conceived and helped organize the Global Atmospheric Research Program, considered the most ambitious international effort in weather research ever undertaken.

=== Dynamic meteorology and oceanography ===
In 1956, Charney left IAS to become a professor of meteorology and director of the Atmospheric and Ocean Dynamics Project at MIT, where for 25 years he made major contributions in dynamic meteorology and oceanography research, including large-scale atmospheric turbulence, feedback interactions between the oceans and atmosphere, the persistence of certain abnormal flow patterns in the atmosphere, and the relationship of such phenomena to droughts.

Among his many fundamental contributions to the field, Charney identified “baroclinic instability”, the first convincing physical explanation for the development of mid-latitude cyclones. Charney identified the mechanism that explains the size, structure, and growth rate of mid-latitude weather systems, and is a ubiquitous phenomenon in rotating, stratified fluids like our oceans and atmosphere.

From 1974 to 1977, Charney headed the meteorology department at MIT. In addition to his revolutionizing research, Charney is remembered as a charismatic and optimistic professor among former students from MIT, where he remained until his death in 1981. Students describe falling into “orbit around the Charney sun”. There is a library named in Charney's honor in the building that holds the MIT Department of Earth, Atmospheres and Planetary Sciences.

=== Charney Report ===
In 1979, Charney chaired an "ad hoc study group on carbon dioxide and climate" for the National Research Council. The resulting 22-page report "Carbon dioxide and climate: A scientific assessment" is one of the earliest modern scientific assessments about global warming. Its main conclusion can be found on page 2: "We estimate the most probable global warming for a doubling of CO_{2} to be near 3 °C with a probable error of ±1.5 °C." This estimate of climate sensitivity has been essentially unchanged for over four decades, e.g., the IPCC Fourth Assessment Report (2007) says that "equilibrium climate sensitivity is likely to be in the range 2 °C to 4.5 °C, with a best estimate value of about 3 °C. It is very unlikely to be less than 1.5 °C. Values substantially higher than 4.5 °C cannot be excluded, but agreement with observations is not as good for those values."

In 2019 climate scientists, celebrating the 40th anniversary of the Charney report, said: "In retrospect, the Charney report seems like the scientific equivalent of the handwriting on the wall ... Their warning was accurate and remains more relevant than ever."

=== Centenary celebration ===
In February 2018, MIT held a symposium, named MIT on Chaos and Climate, in honor of the 100th anniversary of the birth of Charney and Edward Lorenz. The two-day event featured presentations from world-renowned experts on the many scientific contributions that the two pioneers made on the fields of numerical weather prediction, physical oceanography, atmospheric dynamics, and experimental fluid dynamics, as well as the personal legacy they left behind of integrity, optimism, and collaboration. In one presentation, Joseph Pedlosky, scientist emeritus at the Woods Hole Oceanographic Institution and world leader in physical oceanography, said this of his friend and mentor Jule Charney:

It's fair to say that Jule Charney turned the mystery of the erratic behavior of the atmosphere into a recognizable–although very, very difficult–problem in fluid physics. I would like, however, to talk today about Jule's more personal and I think equally vital contribution to our field, in terms of the inspiring generosity of spirit he showed that advanced the atmosphere of collaborative collegiality in our field. He set a standard for personal and scientific integrity that I think is often overlooked but of exceptional importance.

A video produced for the event highlights the indelible mark made by Charney and Lorenz on MIT and the field of meteorology as a whole.

== Honors and awards ==
- 1937 Elected to Phi Beta Kappa.
- 1961 Awarded the Symons Gold Medal of the Royal Meteorological Society.
- 1964 Awarded the Carl-Gustaf Rossby Research Medal of the American Meteorological Society, for research that "led to a more fundamental understanding of the atmosphere's general circulation, hydrodynamical instability, the structure of hurricanes, the dynamics of ocean currents, the propagation of wave energy and many other aspects of geophysical fluid mechanics."
- 1966 Appointed the first Alfred P. Sloan Professor of Meteorology at MIT.
- 1969 Awarded the Hodgkins Medal of the Smithsonian Institution.
- 1971 Awarded the prestigious International Meteorological Organization Prize by the World Meteorological Organization.
- 1976 Awarded the William Bowie Medal of the American Geophysical Union.

The American Meteorological Society annual presents the "Jule G. Charney Award" to individuals "in recognition of highly significant research or development achievement in the atmospheric or hydrologic sciences".

== See also ==
- Richard Lindzen
- Edward Norton Lorenz
- Quasi-geostrophic equations
- Geostrophic wind
- Eric Eady
- Isidoro Orlanski
