= Baroclinity =

Measure of misalignment between the gradients of pressure and density in a fluid

Density lines and isobars cross vertically in a baroclinic fluid.

Visualization of a (fictive) formation of isotherms (red-orange) and isobars (blue) in a baroclinic atmospheric layering.

A rotating tank experiment modelling baroclinic eddies in the atmosphere

In fluid dynamics, the baroclinity (often called baroclinicity) of a stratified fluid is a measure of how misaligned the gradient of pressure is from the gradient of density in a fluid. In meteorology, a baroclinic flow is one in which the density depends on both temperature and pressure (the fully general case). A simpler case, barotropic flow, allows for density dependence only on pressure, so that the curl of the pressure-gradient force vanishes.

Baroclinity is proportional to:

$$\nabla p \times \nabla \rho$$

which is proportional to the sine of the angle between surfaces of constant pressure and surfaces of constant density. Thus, in a barotropic fluid (which is defined by zero baroclinity), these surfaces are parallel.

In Earth's atmosphere, barotropic flow is a better approximation in the tropics, where density surfaces and pressure surfaces are both nearly level, whereas in higher latitudes the flow is more baroclinic. These midlatitude belts of high atmospheric baroclinity are characterized by the frequent formation of synoptic-scale cyclones, although these are not really dependent on the baroclinity term per se: for instance, they are commonly studied on pressure coordinate iso-surfaces where that term has no contribution to vorticity production.

== Baroclinic instability ==
Before the classic work of Jule Charney and Eric Eady on baroclinic instability in the late 1940s.

Baroclinic instability can be investigated in the laboratory using a rotating, fluid filled annulus. The annulus is heated at the outer wall and cooled at the inner wall, and the resulting fluid flows give rise to baroclinically unstable waves.

== Baroclinic vector ==
Beginning with the equation of motion for a frictionless fluid (the Euler equations) and taking the curl, one arrives at the equation of motion for the curl of the fluid velocity, that is to say, the vorticity.

In a fluid that is not all of the same density, a source term appears in the vorticity equation whenever surfaces of constant density (isopycnic surfaces) and surfaces of constant pressure (isobaric surfaces) are not aligned. The material derivative of the local vorticity is given by:

$$\frac{D\vec\omega}{Dt} \equiv
\frac{\partial\vec{\omega}}{\partial t} + \left(\vec{u} \cdot \vec{\nabla}\right) \vec{\omega} =
\left(\vec{\omega} \cdot \vec{\nabla}\right) \vec{u} - \vec{\omega} \left(\vec{\nabla} \cdot \vec{u}\right) +
\underbrace{\frac{1}{\rho^2}\vec{\nabla}\rho \times \vec{\nabla}p}_\text{baroclinic contribution}$$

(where $\vec u$ is the velocity and $\vec \omega = \vec \nabla \times \vec u$ is the vorticity, $p$ is the pressure, and $\rho$ is the density). The baroclinic contribution is the vector:

$$\frac{1}{\rho^2} \vec{\nabla}\rho \times \vec{\nabla}p$$

This vector, sometimes called the solenoidal vector, is of interest both in compressible fluids and in incompressible (but inhomogeneous) fluids. Internal gravity waves as well as unstable Rayleigh–Taylor modes can be analyzed from the perspective of the baroclinic vector. It is also of interest in the creation of vorticity by the passage of shocks through inhomogeneous media, such as in the Richtmyer–Meshkov instability.

Experienced divers are familiar with the very slow waves that can be excited at a thermocline or a halocline, which are known as internal waves. Similar waves can be generated between a layer of water and a layer of oil. When the interface between these two surfaces is not horizontal and the system is close to hydrostatic equilibrium, the gradient of the pressure is vertical but the gradient of the density is not. Therefore the baroclinic vector is nonzero, and the sense of the baroclinic vector is to create vorticity to make the interface level out. In the process, the interface overshoots, and the result is an oscillation which is an internal gravity wave. Unlike surface gravity waves, internal gravity waves do not require a sharp interface. For example, in bodies of water, a gradual gradient in temperature or salinity is sufficient to support internal gravity waves driven by the baroclinic vector.

== Bibliography ==
- Holton, James R. (2004). Dmowska, Renata; Holton, James R.; Rossby, H. Thomas (eds.). An Introduction to Dynamic Meteorology. International Geophysics Series. Vol. 88 (4th ed.). Burlington, MA: Elsevier Academic Press. ISBN 978-0-12-354015-7.
- Gill, Adrian E. (1982). Donn, William L. (ed.). Atmosphere-Ocean Dynamics. International Geophysical Series. Vol. 30. San Diego, CA: Academic Press. ISBN 978-0-12-283522-3.
- Pedlosky, Joseph (1987) [1979]. Geophysical Fluid Dynamics (2nd ed.). New York: Springer-Verlag. ISBN 978-0-387-96387-7.
- Tritton, D.J. (1988) [1977]. Physical Fluid Dynamics (2nd ed.). New York, NJ: Oxford University Press. ISBN 978-0-19-854493-7.
- Vallis, Geoffrey K. (2007) [2006]. "Vorticity and Potential Vorticity". Atmospheric and Oceanic Fluid Dynamics: Fundamentals and Large-Scale Circulation. Cambridge: Cambridge University Press. ISBN 978-0-521-84969-2.
