= Hermann Flohn =

Hermann Flohn (19 February 1912 – 23 June 1997) was a climatologist. Flohn was professor at the University of Bonn and head of the department at the Institute of Meteorology of Bonn University. He produced about 360 publications. Flohn was member in numerous scientific societies such as the Bavarian Academy, the Academy of Sciences Leopoldina, the New York Academy of Sciences, and the Royal Academy of Belgium.

== Life ==
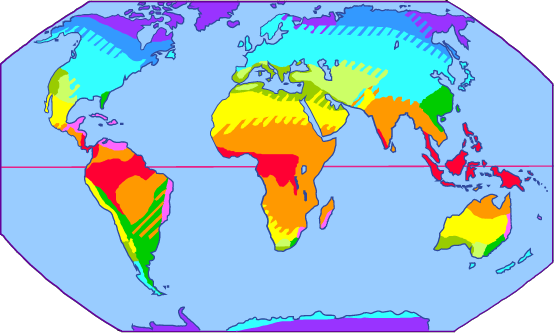
Flohn climate classification

Flohn was born in Frankfurt am Main, he studied geography, meteorology, geophysics, and geology at the universities of Frankfurt and Innsbruck. Having obtained his doctorate in 1934, he accepted a position at the newly established German Meteorological Service (Reichswetterdienst). From 1941 he was employed at the meteorological service of the Luftwaffe High Command.

In 1941 Flohn published the first German article concerning anthropogenic climate change. Having returned to the Deutscher Wetterdienst after the war, Flohn from 1950 helped develop the theory of atmospheric circulation. Flohn was one of the first and leading global climate change researchers. From 1961 he worked as a lecturer at the University of Bonn. In 1977 Flohn retired, he died in 1997 in Bonn, aged 85.

== Awards ==
- Order of Merit of the Federal Republic of Germany (Großes Verdienstkreuz), 1973
- International Meteorological Organization Prize, 1986
- Order of Merit of North Rhine-Westphalia, 1993

== Selected works ==
- Flohn H. 1941: Die Tätigkeit des Menschen als Klimafaktor. Z. f. Erdkunde, 9, 13–22.
- Life on a Warmer Earth--Possible Climatic Consequences of Man-Made Global Warming, 1981.
- Possible Climatic Consequences of a Man-Made Global Warming, 1980.
- Flohn H. 1954: Witterung und Klima in Mitteleuropa, 2. Auflage. Forschungen zur Deutschen Landeskunde, 78, S. Hirzel Verlag, Stuttgart, S. 214.
- Flohn H. 1968: Contributions to a Meteorology of the Tibetan Highlands. In: Atmospheric Science Paper 130, Colorado State University, Fort Collins, Colorado, 120 p.
- Flohn H. 1968: Le temps et le climat. L´Univ. Connaissances, Hachette, Paris.
- Flohn H. 1968: Clima y tiempo. Biblioteca para el Hombre Actual, Ediciones Guadarrama, Madrid.
- Flohn H. 1969: Climate and Weather. World Univ. Library, McGraw-Hill, New York.
- Flohn H. 1969: Local Wind Systems. In: World Survey of Climatology, Vol. 2, General Climatology 2, Elsevier, Amsterdam, 139–171.
- Flohn H. 1971: Arbeiten zur allgemeinen Klimatologie. 315 S. Wiss. Buchges., Darmstadt.
- Flohn H., Fantechi R. 1984: The Climate of Europe: Past, Present and Future. D. Reidel Publ. Comp., Dordrecht.
- Flohn H. 1985: Das Problem der Klimaänderungen in Vergangenheit und Zukunft. Erträge der Forschung, Bd. 220, Wiss. Buchges., Darmstadt.
- Flohn H. 1977: Climate and Energy: A Scenario to a 21st Century Problem. Climatic Change, 1, 5–20
- Flohn H. 1979: Climatology as a Geophysical Science. Climate Monitor, Special Edition, March 1979, Hubert Lamb - Professor Emeritus, 10–18. (Gewidmet H. Lamb zum 65. Geburtstag)
- Flohn H. 1979: Summary Review and Some Thoughts on Future Climatic Evolutions. In: NES Colleque International: Evolution des Atmosohères Planetaires et Climatologie de la Terre, Nice 16-20 Oct. 1978, 569–574.
- Flohn H. 1979: Possible Climatic Consequences of a Man-Made Global Warming. In:Working Paper, Internat. Institute for Applied Systems Analysis, Laxenburg, Austria, WP 79-86 (XI + 103 p). (auch in Internat. Institute for Applied Systems Analysis, Laxenburg, Austria, RR-80-30, Dec. 1980)
- Flohn H. 1980: Man's Increasing Impact on Climate: Atmospheric Processes. In: N. Polunin (Ed.): Growth without ecodisaster? Proc. 2nd Intern. Conf. Environmental Future. Reykjavik, June 1977, MacMillan Press, London, 31–44. (Diskussion 45–59)
- Flohn H. 1980: Possible Climatic Consequences of a Man-made Global Warming. In: R. Kavanagh (Ed.): Energy System Analysis. Proc. Intern. Conf. Dublin, 9-11 Oct. 1979, D. Reidel Publ. Comp., Dordrecht, 558–568. (1981: Life on a Warmer Earth, Possible Climatic Consequences of Man-made Global Warming. Executive Report 3, based on research by H. Flohn, Intern. Inst. for Applied System Analysis IIASA, Laxenburg, Austria, pp. 59.)
