= Mariano Estoque =

Prominent Filipino-American Meteorologist

- Born: December 31, 1921; Philippines
- Died: January 10, 2022 (aged 100)
- Known for: Research on tropical cyclones and atmospheric boundary layers
- Scientific career
- Fields: Meteorology, Atmospheric science
- Workplaces: University of Hawaii; University of Miami; Johns Hopkins University

Mariano Estoque was a Filipino-American meteorologist known for his significant contributions to tropical meteorology and atmospheric science. He held prominent academic positions at several universities and conducted pioneering research on tropical cyclones and atmospheric boundary layers.

== Biography ==
Mariano Estoque was born in the Philippines on December 31, 1921, and later moved to the United States to pursue his career in meteorology. He received his education at New York University and became a respected figure in the field. He died in 2022.

== Academic career ==
Estoque served as the chairman of the Department of Meteorology at the University of Hawaii. He later accepted an appointment as a visiting professor of atmospheric science at the University of Miami's School of Environmental and Planetary Sciences, where he continued his research on tropical cyclones in collaboration with the National Hurricane Research Laboratory of the U.S. Weather Bureau.

Prior to his positions in Hawaii and Miami, Estoque worked as a meteorology professor at Johns Hopkins University. There, he collaborated with colleague George Benton on research regarding the origin of precipitation. Their studies concluded that despite significant evapotranspiration, approximately 90% of rain in the Mississippi Basin originates from the ocean, with only 10% coming from land sources.

== Research contributions ==
Estoque made notable contributions to the understanding of:

- Tropical cyclone formation and movement
- Atmospheric boundary layer processes
- Precipitation patterns and water cycle dynamics
- Numerical weather prediction methods

His research on the origins of precipitation with George Benton challenged existing assumptions about rainfall sources and provided important insights into the water cycle. Estoque's 1962 paper "The sea breeze as a function of the prevailing synoptic situation" became a significant contribution to understanding coastal weather patterns.

== Later career ==
In his later years, Estoque worked as a consultant for several weather agencies in California. He maintained connections with his home country as a former weather observer of the Philippine Atmospheric, Geophysical and Astronomical Services Administration (PAGASA).

In 2008, Estoque expressed criticism regarding weather forecasting capabilities in the Philippines, describing them as being in "the most primitive condition" and noting that local forecasters lacked sufficient knowledge in atmospheric science.

Estoque participated in the Department of Science and Technology's "Balik Scientist program" in the Philippines, where he aimed to improve knowledge in meteorology.

== Legacy ==
In 1997, Mariano Estoque was awarded the International Meteorological Organization Prize by the World Meteorological Organization. The prize consists of a 14-carat gold medal displaying the WMO emblem and the Latin inscription "Pro singulari erga scientiam meteorologicam merito" (for outstanding work on the science of meteorology), along with a monetary award of 10,000 Swiss francs.
