= Joseph Smagorinsky =

American meteorologist

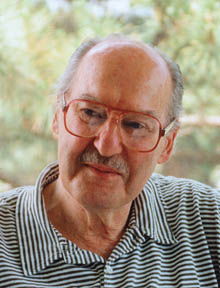
- Joseph Smagorinsky
- Born: January 29, 1924; New York City, New York, US
- Died: September 21, 2005 (aged 81); Hillsborough, New Jersey, United States
- Education: New York University
- Known for: General Circulation Model
- Spouse: Margaret Smagorinsky
- Scientific career
- Fields: Meteorology
- Workplaces: National Oceanographic and Atmospheric Administration; Princeton University
- Doctoral advisor: Bernhard Haurwitz

Joseph Smagorinsky (29 January 1924 – 21 September 2005) was an American meteorologist and the first director of the National Oceanic and Atmospheric Administration (NOAA)'s Geophysical Fluid Dynamics Laboratory (GFDL).

== Early life ==
Joseph Smagorinsky was born to Nathan Smagorinsky and Dina Azaroff. His parents were from Gomel, Belarus, which they fled during the pogroms of the early 20th century. Nathan and Dina bore three sons in Gomel: Jacob (who died as an infant), Samuel (born 1903), and David (born 1907). In 1913, Nathan emigrated from the coast of Finland, passing through Ellis Island and settling on the Lower East Side of Manhattan. Nathan at first was a house painter. Then, with the help of a relative, he opened a paint store. In 1916, with the business established, Dina, Sam, and David emigrated by going to Murmansk and then southward along the Norwegian coast to Christiana (now Oslo) and boarding a boat to New York where they joined Nathan. They had two other children: Hillel (Harry) (born 1919) and Joseph (born 1924).

Like his three brothers, Joseph worked in their father's paint store, which over the years evolved into a hardware and paint store. Sam and Harry stayed in the painting and hardware business, with Harry eventually taking ownership of the original store. As a teenager, David began painting signs for shop owners and subsequently opened a sign painting business.

== Education and early career ==
Smagorinsky attended Stuyvesant High School in Manhattan. He then earned his B.S. (1947), M.S. (1948), and Ph.D. (1953) at New York University (NYU). In the middle of his sophomore year at NYU, he entered the Air Force and joined a group of cadet recruits, chosen for their talents in mathematics and physic, for the meteorology program. He and other recruits were sent to Brown University to study mathematics and physics for six months. He was then sent to the Massachusetts Institute of Technology (MIT) to learn dynamical meteorology. His instructor was Edward Lorenz. During the war Smagorinsky flew in the nose of bombers as a weather observer, making weather forecasts based on visible factors such as the estimated size of wave, observed air temperature, and wind velocity at the plane's altitude.

Following the war, Smagorinsky concluded his studies. He originally aspired to be a naval architect, but was not admitted to the Webb Institute. He then turned to meteorology as a career and educational focus. As a doctoral student, while serving the remainder of his army commitment, he attended a lecture on weather forecasting conducted by Jule Charney, and asked a series of questions during the question-and-answer session following the talk. Charney, a prominent atmospheric scientist, invited Smagorinsky to the Institute for Advanced Study to examine the possible predictability of large-scale motions in the middle troposphere using the new electronic computer being designed by John von Neumann.

In April 1950, with Ragnar Fjørtoft, John Freeman, and George Platzman, he worked with Charney to solve Charney's simplest equations on the Electronic Numerical Integrator and Computer (ENIAC). His wife Margaret Smagorinsky (née Knoepfel) was also a member of the team that programmed the ENIAC computer, and was the first woman statistician hired by the Weather Bureau. Von Neumann's new Princeton computer had been delayed so arrangements were made with the Army to use its computer in Aberdeen, Maryland. The results were realistic enough to demonstrate that weather prediction by numerical process was a promising prospect. After the ENIAC work, Smagorinsky moved to the Institute for Advanced Study to work with Charney and von Neumann on the development of a new approach to weather forecasting that employed the computer.

At the Institute for Advanced Study, von Neumann used his mathematical knowledge and Smagorinsky worked with Charney to develop a new approach called numerical weather prediction. This approach relied on data collected from weather balloons. The data were then fed into computers and subjected to the laws of physics, enabling forecasts of how turbulence, water, heat, and other factors interacted to produce weather patterns Smagorinsky also visited his children's elementary school classrooms to demonstrate how weather balloons worked.

In his doctoral dissertation, conducted at NYU under the direction of Bernhard Haurwitz, Smagorinsky developed a theory for how heat sources and sinks in mid-latitudes, created by the thermal contrast between land and oceans, disturb the path of the jet stream. This theory provided one of the first applications of Jule Charney's simplification of the equations of motion for the atmosphere, now known as quasi-geostrophic theory. This work benefited from interactions with Charney at the Institute for Advanced Study. This theory has been elaborated over the years to provide insights into the maintenance of the climate in mid-latitudes and the interaction between the tropics and mid-latitudes.

== Leadership of Geophysical Fluid Dynamics Laboratory ==
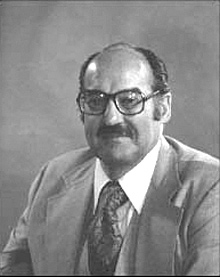
A photograph of Smagorinsky taken at GFDL.

Following his apprenticeship and work with von Neumann and Charney, in 1953, at age 29, Smagorinsky accepted a position at the U.S. Weather Bureau and was among the pioneers of the Joint Numerical Weather Prediction (JNWP) Unit. In 1955, at von Neumann's instigation, the U.S. Weather Bureau created a General Circulation Research Section under Smagorinsky's direction. Smagorinsky felt that his duty was to continue with the final step of the von Neumann/Charney computer modeling program: a three-dimensional, global, primitive-equation general circulation model of the atmosphere. The General Circulation Research Section was initially located in Suitland, Maryland, near the Weather Bureau's JNWP unit. The section moved to Washington, D.C., and was renamed the General Circulation Research Laboratory in 1959 and then renamed again to the Geophysical Fluid Dynamics Laboratory (GFDL) in 1963. The lab moved to its current home at Princeton University in 1968. Smagorinsky continued to direct the lab until his retirement in January 1983.

Smagorinsky's key insight was that the increasing power of computers would allow progress beyond simulating the evolution of the atmosphere for a few days, as in weather prediction, and toward the simulation of the Earth's climate. The intention of such simulations is not to predict the detailed evolution of the weather, but integrating the equations of motion, thermodynamics, and radiative transfer for long enough time periods to simulate the climate, enabling one to study how these statistics were controlled by the atmospheric composition, the character of the Earth's surface, and the circulation of the oceans.

Two scientists that Smagorinsky recruited to the GFDL were climate modeler Syukuro Manabe in 1959 and ocean modeler Kirk Bryan in 1961, who spearheaded the development of the first climate model in 1969, a general circulation model that was the first approach to take into account the interactions of oceans and atmosphere. Smagorinsky assigned Manabe to the General Circulation Model (GCM) coding and development effort. By 1963, Smagorinsky, Manabe, and their collaborators had completed a nine-level, hemispheric primitive-equation General Circulation Model. Manabe was given a large programming staff and was thus able to focus on mathematical structure of the models, without becoming overly involved in coding. In 1955–56, Smagorinsky collaborated with John von Neumann, Jule Charney, and Norman Phillips to develop a 2-level, zonal hemispheric model using a subset of the primitive equations. Beginning in 1959, he proceeded to develop a nine-level primitive-equation General Circulation Model (still hemispheric). By the end of the next decade, GCMs emerged globally as a central tool in climate research. Other researchers who worked with Smagorinsky in Washington and Princeton included Isidoro Orlanski, Jerry Mahlman, Yoshio Kurihara, Kikuro Miyakoda, Rod Graham, Leith Holloway, Isaac Held, Garreth Williams, George Philander, and Douglas Lilly.

Development of this first climate model was based on Smagorinsky's belief that individual inquiry would be inadequate for addressing such a complex problem. He realized that it would take large-scale numerical modeling with teams of scientists using commonly shared high-speed computers to achieve such a breakthrough. As stated in the Bulletin of the American Meteorological Society in 1992, "Dr. Smagorinsky's almost relentless pursuit of excellence at Geophysical Fluid Dynamics Laboratory set a standard for other laboratories and centers that have contributed immensely to the growth of meteorology as a science" throughout the world. Michael MacCracken, president of International Association of Meteorology and Atmospheric Sciences, wrote following Smagorinsky's death: "From its earliest days, GFDL has been world renowned, with an outstanding set of scientists doing outstanding work that attracted scientists from around the world to come to learn and collaborate – and then return to their home countries or other institutions as outstanding scientists. Not only a whole new scientific field of investigation, but a community of scientists capable of doing it well has been created."

Smagorinsky was among the earliest researchers who sought to exploit new methods of numerical weather prediction (NWP) to extend forecasting past one or two days. Smagorinsky published a seminal paper in 1963 on his research using primitive equations of atmospheric dynamics to simulate the atmosphere's circulation. This paper fundamentally changed the approach to modeling climate. He extended early weather models to include variables such as wind, cloud cover, precipitation, atmospheric pressure and radiation emanating from the earth and sun. In order to make these simulations possible, a method was needed to account for atmospheric turbulence that occurred on scales smaller than the model's grid size but still played a crucial role in the atmospheric energy cycle. With colleagues Douglas Lilly and James Deardorff, both at the National Center for Atmospheric Research (NCAR), he developed one of the first successful approaches to large eddy simulation (e.g., the Smagorinsky-Lilly model), providing a solution to this problem that is still in use, not only in meteorology, but in all fields involving fluid dynamics.

Smagorinsky earned fame for his ability to secure the world's fastest computers for his laboratory several times. Many wondered how a single government scientist had such leverage in the highly competitive battle for limited resources. Jerry Mahlman wrote: "Without the level of scientific and computational support provided by [Smagorinsky], these achievements [global warming awareness, sophisticated computer models, extended weather forecasting] would have required at least another decade of development to achieve."

== Influence on global warming research ==
In the 1970s, under Smagorinsky's direction, scientists at his laboratory devised the first simulations of the response of climate to increasing carbon dioxide in the atmosphere, providing the first modern estimates of climate sensitivity and emphasizing the importance of water vapor feedback and stratospheric cooling. Scientists at the laboratory also developed the first coupled atmosphere-ocean climate models for studies of global warming, emphasizing the important differences between the "equilibrium" and "transient" responses to increasing carbon dioxide.

Smagorinsky led and contributed to international committees to improve global weather forecasts. Coordinated by the World Meteorological Organization, the efforts led to the first use of satellites to measure temperature and moisture. Tony Hollingsworth of the European Centre for Medium-Range Weather Forecasts (ECMWF) made the point in his remarks at the Princeton lecture after Smagorinsky was presented with the Benjamin Franklin Medal in Earth Science that Smagorinsky's work resulted in saving millions of lives around the world with severe weather predictions. He reiterated the remark in his letter to GFDL following Smagorinsky's memorial service.

== Later career ==
The year GFDL moved to Princeton University, Smagorinsky was named a visiting lecturer with the rank of professor in geological and geophysical sciences at the university. He helped develop the Program in Atmospheric and Oceanic Sciences, a doctoral program in the Department of Geosciences that collaborates closely with the GFDL. Following his retirement as director of the GFDL in 1983, he served as a visiting senior fellow in atmospheric and oceanic sciences at Princeton until 1998. "Dr. Smagorinsky, a major player in the move of the GFDL to Princeton more than 30 years ago, in effect provided Princeton University with a graduate program," said George Philander, a professor of geosciences and director of the Program in Atmospheric and Oceanic Sciences.

He was the Scientific Research Society national lecturer from 1983 to 1985 and president of American Meteorological Society for 1986. He was elected to the American Academy of Arts and Sciences membership in 1986. He was a member of the Presidential Scientific Advisory Committee Panel on Pollution and the National Research Council's Committee on Atmospheric Science.

== Awards and recognition ==
- Gold medal from the United States Department of Commerce, 1966
- Clarence Leroy Meisinger Award from the American Meteorological Society, 1967
- Carl-Gustaf Rossby Research Medal from the American Meteorological Society, 1972
- Honorary doctorate from LMU Munich, 1972
- Buys Ballot Gold Medal from the Royal Netherlands Academy of Arts and Sciences, 1974
- International Meteorological Organization Prize from the World Meteorological Organization, 1974
- Cleveland Abbe Award for Distinguished Service to Atmospheric Sciences by an Individual from the American Meteorological Society, 1980
- Symons Gold Medal from the Royal Meteorological Society, 1980
- International Meteorological Organization Prize from the World Meteorological Organization, 1988
- Benjamin Franklin Medal in Earth Science from the Franklin Institute in Philadelphia, 2003

== Selected publications ==
- Smagorinsky, J., 1995: "The growth of dynamic meteorology and numerical weather prediction: Some personal reflections". In, Canadian Meteorological Memoirs No. 32: Special Symposium on Atmospheric Research in Canada in Honor of Dr. Warren L. Godson's Fifty Years of Public Service.
- Smagorinsky, J., 1993: "Some historical remarks on the use of non-linear viscosities: Introductory remarks". In, Large Eddy Simulation of Complex Engineering and Geophysical Flows, Proceedings of an International Workshop in Large Eddy Simulation. Cambridge University Press.
- Smagorinsky, J., 1991: "Development of international climate research". In, Strategies for Future Climate Research, Mojib Latif, ed., Hamburg: Max-Planck-Institute für Meteorologie.
- Smagorinsky, J., 1987: "Louis Joseph Battan, 1923–1986". Bulletin of the American Meteorological Society, 68(4), 370.
- Smagorinsky, J., 1986: "The AMS's continuing role in promoting communications and setting standards". Bulletin of the American Meteorological Society, 67(8), 938.
- Smagorinsky, J., 1986: "GARP's objectives in weather prediction: Expectations and realizations". In, International Conference on Results of Global Weather Experiment and Their Implications for World Weather Watch, Vol. 1, Geneva, Switzerland, 19–34.
- Smagorinsky, J., 1986: "The long range eye of Jerry Namias". In, Namias Symposium, A special symposium in honor of the 75th birthday of Dr. Jerome Namias. Experimental Climate Forecast Center of Scripps Institution of Oceanography, University of California at San Diego: 63–69.
- Smagorinsky, J., 1986: "Review of book: 'Prophet--or Professor? The life and work of Lewis Fry Richardson,' Oliver M. Ashford, and Adam Hilger". Eos, 67(3), 28.
- Smagorinsky, J., 1985: "Prospects of atmospheric modelling and its impacts on weather prediction". In, Medium Range Weather Forecasts: The First 10 Years, Proceedings of the 10th Anniversary of EMCWF, 97–107.
- Smagorinsky, J., 1984: "Review of: 'The Global Climate', J. T. Houghton, ed., Cambridge University Press". WMO Bulletin, 33, 361–362.
- Smagorinsky, J., 1983: "The beginnings of numerical weather prediction and general circulation modeling: Early recollections". Advances in Geophysics, 25, 3–37.
- Smagorinsky, J., 1983: "The Problem of Climate and Climate Variations", World Climate Programme Publication No. WCP-72. World Meteorological Organization.
- Smagorinsky, J., 1982: "Jule Charney (1917–1981)". Quarterly Journal of the Royal Meteorological Society, 108(455), 267–269.
- Smagorinsky, J., 1982: "Scientific basis for the Monsoon Experiment". In, Proceedings of International Conference on the Scientific Results of the Monsoon Experiment, ICSU/WMO GARP. 35–42.
- Smagorinsky, J., L. Armi, F. P. Bretherton, K. Bryan, R. D. Cess, W. L. Gates, J. Hansen, J. E. Kutzbach, and S. Manabe, et al., 1982: "CO_{2} /Climate Review Panel". In, Carbon Dioxide and Climate: A Second Assessment. Washington, DC: National Academy Press, 1–72.
- Smagorinsky, J., 1981: "CO_{2} and climate: A continuing story". In, Climatic Variations and Variability: Facts and Theories, D. Reidel Publishing Co., 661–687.
- Smagorinsky, J., 1981: "Epilogue: a perspective of dynamical meteorology". In, Dynamical Meteorology, New York: Methuen, Inc., 205–219
- Smagorinsky, J., 1981: "Scientific basis for the Monsoon Experiment". In, International Conference on the Scientific Results of the Monsoon Experiment, October 26–30, 1981. Denpasar, Bali, Indonesia.
- Smagorinsky, J., 1981: "Some thoughts on contemporary global climatic variability". In, Nature Pleads Not Guilty: An IFIAS Report on the Project on Drought and Man, Vol. 1, R. V. Garcia. New York: Pergamon Press; 265–296.
- Smagorinsky, J., 1980: "Climate modelling". In, Proceedings of the Technical Conference on Climate – Asia and Western Pacific No. 578, World Meteorological Organization; 139–151.
- Smagorinsky, J., 1978: "History and progress". In, The Global Weather Experiment—Perspective on Its Implementation and Exploitation: A Report of the FGGE Advisory Panel to the U.S. Committee for the Global Atmospheric Research Program (GARP). National Academy of Science, 4–12.
- Smagorinsky, J., and N. A. Phillips, 1978: "Scientific problems of the Global Weather Experiment". In, The Global Weather Experiment, Perspectives on Its Implementation and Exploitation, Report of the FGGE Advisory Panel to the U.S. Committee for the Global Atmospheric Research Program, Assembly of Mathematical and Physical Sciences, National Research Council. National Academy of Science, 13–21.
- Smagorinsky, J., 1972: "The general circulation of the atmosphere". In, Meteorological Challenges: A History, Canada: Information Canada, 3–42.
- Smagorinsky, J., 1971: "Numerical simulation of climate modification". In, Proceedings of the 12th Interagency Conference on Climate Modification, Virginia Beach, VA, 221–226.
- Manabe, S., J. Smagorinsky, J. L. Holloway Jr., and H. M. Stone, 1970: "Simulated climatology of a general circulation model with a hydrologic cycle: III. Effects of increased horizontal computational resolution". Monthly Weather Review, 98(3), 175–212.
- Smagorinsky, J., 1970: "Numerical simulation of the global atmosphere". In, The Global Circulation of the Atmosphere, G. A. Corby (ed.), London, England: Royal Meteorological Society, 24–41.
- Smagorinsky, J., 1969: "Problems and data needs of global atmospheric models for the 1970s". In, First USCG National Data Buoy Systems Scientific Advisory Meeting, U.S. Coast Guard Academy, 16–26.
- Smagorinsky, J., 1969: "Problems and promises of deterministic extended range forecasting". Bulletin of the American Meteorological Society, 50(5), 286–311.
- Manabe, S., and J. Smagorinsky, 1967: "Simulated climatology of a general circulation model with a hydrologic cycle: II. Analysis of the tropical atmosphere". Monthly Weather Review, 95(4), 155–169.
- Smagorinsky, J., 1967: "The role of numerical modeling". Bulletin of the American Meteorological Society, 48(2), 89–93.
- Smagorinsky, J., 1966: "Remarks on mathematical models". In, IBM Scientific Computing Symposium on the Environmental Sciences, Session 5 – Mathematical models, 241–244.
- Manabe, S., J. Smagorinsky, and R. F. Strickler, 1965: "Simulated climatology of a general circulation model with a hydrologic cycle". Monthly Weather Review, 93(12), 769–798.
- Smagorinsky, J., 1965: "Numerical simulation of the atmosphere's general circulation". In, Large-scale Problems in Physics, IBM Scientific Computing Symposium, Yorktown Heights, NY: 141–144.
- Smagorinsky, J., 1965: "Remarks on data processing in meteorology". In, Proceedings of the WMO/IUGG Symposium on Meteorological Data Processing, Brussels, Belgium: WMO Technical Note 73, 1–2.
- Smagorinsky, J., 1965: "Review of book: 'An introduction to the hydrodynamic methods of short period forecasting', by I. A. Kibel". Mathematics of Computation, 19(89), 162–163.
- Smagorinsky, J., S. Manabe, and J. L. Holloway Jr., 1965: "Numerical results from a nine-level general circulation model of the atmosphere". Monthly Weather Review, 93(12), 727–768.
- Smagorinsky, J., R. F. Strickler, W. E. Sangster, S. Manabe, J. L. Holloway, and G. D. Hembree, 1965: "Prediction experiments with a general circulation model". In, Proceedings of IAMAP/WMO International Symposium – Dynamics of Large-scale Processes, Moscow, Russia. 70–134.
- Smagorinsky, J., 1964: "Implications of dynamical modelling of the general circulation on long-range forecasting". In, WMO-IUGG Symposium on Research and Development Aspects of Long-range Forecasting, Boulder, CO.: WMO Technical Note 62, 131–137.
- Smagorinsky, J., 1964: "Some aspects of the general circulation". Quarterly Journal of the Royal Meteorological Society, 90(383), 1–14.
- Smagorinsky, J., 1963: "General Circulation experiments with the primitive equations: I. The basic experiment". Monthly Weather Review, 91(3), 99–164.
- Smagorinsky, J., 1963: "Remarks on geophysical fluid dynamics". Bulletin of the American Meteorological Society, 44, 28–34.
- Smagorinsky, J., 1962: "Numerical weather analysis and prediction, by Phillip D. Thompson". Mathematics of Computation, 16(80), 503–505.
- Smagorinsky, J., 1960: "General circulation experiments with the primitive equations as a function of the parameters". In, International Association of Meteorology and Atmospheric Physics, XIIth General Assembly, Publication IAMAP No. 12/a, Helsinki, Finland, 22–23.
- Smagorinsky, J., 1960: "On the application of numerical methods to the solution of systems of partial differential equations arising in meteorology". In, Frontiers of Numerical Mathematics, A Symposium Conducted by the Mathematics Research Center, United States Army and National Bureau of Standards. University of Wisconsin Press, 107–125.
- Smagorinsky, J., 1960: "On the dynamical prediction of large-scale condensation by numerical methods". In, Physics of Precipitation, 5, AGU Monograph. Washington, DC: American Geophysical Union, 71–78.
- Smagorinsky, J., 1960: "A primitive equation model including condensation processes". In, Proceedings of International Symposium on Numerical Weather Predictions, Japan Meteorological Society, 555.
- Smagorinsky, J., 1958: "On the numerical integration of the primitive equations of motion for baroclinic flow in a closed region". Monthly Weather Review, 86(12), 457–466.
- Eliassen, A., J. S. Sawyer, and J. Smagorinsky, 1957: "Upper air network requirements for numerical weather prediction". WMO Technical Note No. 29. Geneva, CH: WMO.
- Smagorinsky, J., 1956: "On the inclusion of moist adiabatic processes in numerical prediction models". In, Bericht des Deutschen Wetterdienstes, Nr. 38, 82–90.
- Smagorinsky, J., 1955: "A synopsis of research on quasi-stationary perturbations of the mean zonal circulation caused by topography and heating". In, Dynamics of Climate: The Proceedings of a Conference on the Application of Numerical Integration Techniques to the Problem of the General Circulation, October 26–28, 1955. New York, NY: Pergamon Press, 44–49.
- Smagorinsky, J., 1955: "On the numerical prediction of precipitation". Monthly Weather Review, 83(3), 53–68.
- Smagorinsky, J., 1953: "Data processing requirements for the purposes of numerical weather prediction". In, Proceedings of the Eastern Joint Computer Conference, Washington, DC, 22–30.
- Smagorinsky, J., 1953: "The dynamical influence of large-scale heat sources and sinks on the quasi-stationary mean motions of the atmosphere". Quarterly Journal of the Royal Meteorological Society, 79, 342–366.

== Personal life and death ==
Smagorinsky was married to Margaret Smagorinsky from May 29, 1948, to his death at age 81 on September 21, 2005. They met while taking classes at New York University, where Margaret was preparing for a career as a meteorological statistician. Margaret became the Weather Bureau's first female statistician. The couple had two wedding ceremonies. One was a Catholic ceremony at Margaret's mother's insistence; the other was a civil ceremony in the Georgetown garden of Judge Fay Bently. This ceremony was attended only by the required 2 witnesses, Jerry Moss and Margaret's sister Alice Williams. Joseph and Margaret considered this smaller gathering to be their official wedding, given the ways in which his Jewish family and her Catholic family opposed the union. Following their marriage, Margaret chose to stay at home and raise their five children, Anne, Peter, Teresa, Julia, and Frederick.

At the memorial gathering at Guyot Hall, Princeton University in October 2005, following Smagorinsky's September death, he was honored with a story of his life, sung to the tune of Ervin Drake's "It Was a Very Good Year".

Margaret died on November 14, 2011, and was buried with him in Princeton Cemetery. On December 29, 2011, a memorial service was held for Margaret Smagorinsky at the Nassau Inn in Princeton, at which many of Smagorinsky's colleagues and their wives honored her role working with the GFDL during his tenure as founder and director.
