= Jagadish Shukla =

Indian meteorologist (born 1944)

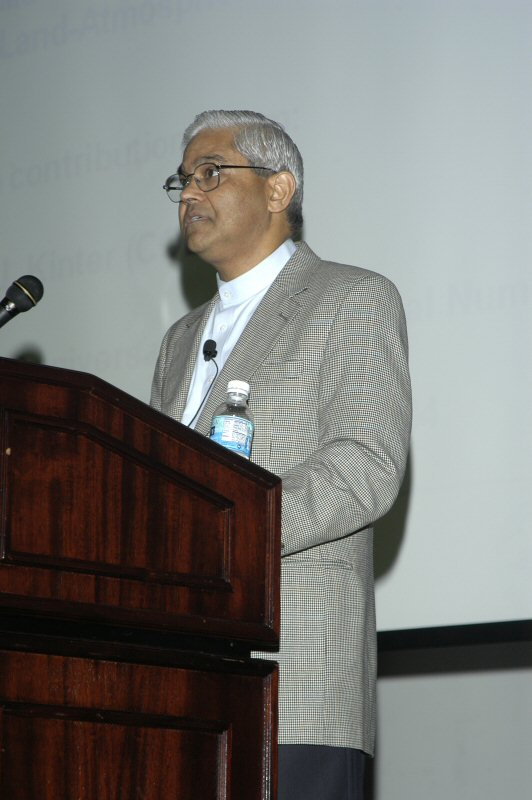
- Awards: Padma Shri Award (2012), Exceptional Scientific Achievement Medal of the NASA
- Scientific career
- Fields: Meteorology
- Doctoral advisor: Jule Gregory Charney

Jagadish Shukla (born 1944) is an Indian meteorologist and Distinguished University Professor at George Mason University in the United States.

== Early years ==
Shukla was born in 1944 in the village of Middha in the Ballia district of Uttar Pradesh, India. This village had no electricity, no roads or transportation, and no primary school building. Most of his primary school education was received under a large banyan tree, and he attended classes held in a cow shed. He passed from the S.R.S. High School, Sheopur, in the first class with distinction in Mathematics and Sanskrit. He studied science, firstly outside school, then at S.C. College, Ballia. At Banaras Hindu University, he passed BSc (honors) at the age of 18 with Physics, Mathematics, and Geology (first class) followed after a brief interval from studies by an MSc in Geophysics in 1964 and PhD in Geophysics in 1971 as an external student of BHU. He subsequently gained an ScD in Meteorology from MIT in 1976.

== Professional activities ==
Shukla is a Distinguished University Professor at George Mason University, USA, where he founded the Department of Atmospheric, Oceanic, and Earth Sciences and Climate Dynamics PhD Program.

During the 1970s, the "butterfly effect" or "chaos" was the dominant theme of predictability research, and the community was skeptical about the prospects for dynamical seasonal prediction. Shukla's research led to the notion of predictability in the midst of chaos, and the development of a scientific basis for the prediction of climate which derives from the influence of the slow variations of the atmosphere's lower boundary conditions and their interactions with the atmosphere. Recognizing the enormous scientific implications and potential benefits to society from accurate and reliable seasonal forecasts, Shukla took an extraordinary and risky decision to resign from his tenure professorship at the University of Maryland, and start a nonprofit institute, IGES, in his garage. Work by Shukla and his scientific colleagues has inspired routine dynamical seasonal prediction by numerous weather and climate centres around the world, helping society manage agricultural and economic activities, saving lives and property. Shukla also recognised the importance of land surface processes in climate variability and predictability and therefore established the Center for Ocean-Land-Atmosphere Studies (COLA). Recognition of the importance of atmosphere-land interactions in climate dynamics has led to numerous research programs, field experiments, and space-missions. Another important contribution made by Shukla was his proposal in the early 1980s to carry out retrospective analysis of atmospheric observations. COLA scientists conducted the first pilot reanalysis as proof of concept at a time when the community was sceptical about the feasibility of reanalysis. Reanalysis of past data and climate diagnostic studies are now an important component of climate research.

Shukla's scientific contributions include studies of: the dynamics of monsoon depressions; the influences of snow, albedo, soil wetness, and surface roughness on climate variability; the influences of sea surface temperature in the Arabian Sea, equatorial Pacific Ocean, and north Pacific Ocean on seasonal variability; the intraseasonal and inter-annual variability of monsoons; the predictability and prediction of monsoons, tropical droughts, and El Niño and the Southern Oscillation; Amazon deforestation, and desertification and reforestation in Sahel; and the seamless prediction of natural and forced climate variability. He has served as PhD thesis adviser for more than 20 students at MIT, the University of Maryland, and George Mason University. He has contributed to over 250 scientific papers and book chapters as author or co-author. He was a lead author of the Intergovernmental Panel on Climate Change (IPCC) Fourth Assessment Report in 2007, which shared the Nobel Peace Prize with Vice-President Al Gore. He was appointed by the Governors of Virginia in 2008 and 2014 to their respective Climate Commissions.

Shukla has worked closely with scientists in India, Italy, Brazil, and South Korea. At the behest of the then Prime Minister Rajiv Gandhi, Shukla helped establish the National Centre for Medium Range Weather Forecasting (NCMRWF) in New Delhi, India. At the behest of the late Dr. Abdus Salam, Shukla helped to form a weather and climate research group at the International Centre for Theoretical Physics (ICTP) in Trieste, Italy, which provides training to many scientists from developing countries. Shukla and COLA scientists have also helped in the establishment of a new Department of Atmospheric and Oceanic Sciences in Allahabad University, India. He was a member of the inaugural committees for the establishment of the International Research Institute for Climate and Society (IRI) at Columbia University, and the International Pacific Research Center (IPRC) at the University of Hawaii. In collaboration with the Director of ICTP, and the Secretary General of the World Meteorological Organization (WMO), Shukla helped establish the South Asian Climate Outlook Forum which enables South Asian countries to meet before each monsoon season to discuss their monsoon forecasts. At the behest of the then Prime Minister, Dr. Manmohan Singh, Shukla was appointed to be the Chairman of the International Advisory Panel to advance the weather and climate enterprise of India.

Shukla has been associated with the World Climate Research Programme since its inception. He has been a member or chairman of numerous national and international programs, including the Monsoon Experiment (MONEX), the Tropical Rainfall Measurement Mission (TRMM), the Dynamical Extended-Range Forecasting (DERF) project, the Tropical Ocean Global Atmosphere program (TOGA), the Global Ocean-Atmosphere-Land Surface (GOALS) Program, the Climate Variability (CLIVAR) program, the ECMWF re-analysis (ERA) project, the Global Energy and Water Cycle Experiment (GEWEX), Continental-scale International Project (GCIP), the Atlantic Climate Change Program (ACCP), the Seasonal-to-Interannual Modeling and Analysis Project (SIMAP), the Austral-Asian Monsoon Working Group (AAMWG), the World Climate Research Programme (WCRP) Joint Scientific Committee (JSC), the Coordinated Observation and Prediction of the Earth System (COPES) program, and the WCRP Modeling Panel (WMP). He was chairman of the 2008 World Modeling Summit for Climate Prediction, and he has been an advocate for creating multi-national climate modelling and prediction centres.

Shukla was the Founding President of the Institute of Global Environment and Society (IGES) and directed its Center for Ocean-Land-Atmosphere Studies (COLA), which aims to improve understanding of climate variability and predictability on intraseasonal to decadal time scales within a changing climate. In 2013 it was decided to dissolve IGES. In 2015, IGES/COLA staff were hired as GMU employees and COLA continues to thrive as a centre of excellence within GMU.

Shukla has also been involved with several organisations dedicated to social justice, poverty reduction, and rural development. He was a long-time member of the Board of Trustees of the Seghal Foundation, dedicated to rural development in India. He established Gandhi Degree College in his village for education of rural students especially women.

=== Awards ===
- In 2016, Shukla became an Honorary Member of the American Meteorological Society, in recognition of his outstanding achievements in the atmospheric and related sciences. This distinction is considered the highest award of the Society and is "as much of an honor for the Society as it is for the individual."
- In 2012, Shukla received the Padma Shri Award from the President of India, a national award honouring high achievement.
- In 2008, Shukla became a Fellow of the American Geophysical Union (AGU).
- In 2007, Shukla received the 52nd International Meteorological Organization (IMO) Prize from the World Meteorological Organization, the highest scientific recognition in the world.
- In 2005, Shukla received the Carl Gustav Rossby Research Medal of the American Meteorological Society, the highest scientific recognition in the United States.
- In 2001, Shulka received the Walker Gold Medal of the Indian Meteorological Society, the highest scientific recognition in India. * In 1982, Shukla received the Exceptional Scientific Achievement Medal of NASA, the highest honour given to a civilian by NASA.
- In 1996, Shukla was named a Fellow of the Indian Meteorological Society (AMS), and an Associate Fellow of the Academy of Sciences of the Developing World (TWAS).
- In 1982, Shukla received the Exceptional Scientific Achievement Medal, the highest honour given to a civilian by NASA.
- Shukla has been a member/chairman of numerous national and international panels and committees, including a member of the Virginia Governor's Commission on Climate Change, and the Indian Prime Minister's Council on Climate Change.

== RICO 20 Controversy ==
On 1 September 2015, Shukla was lead author of a letter from twenty climate scientists to President Obama, Attorney General Loretta Lynch, and OSTP Director John Holdren calling on government to prosecute corporations and other organizations that have “knowingly deceived the American people about the risks of climate change” using RICO laws designed for other forms of organized crime. This letter was cited the following October by Representative Lamar Smith (R–TX) in an announcement of plans to investigate Shukla's IGES. Subsequently, the Inspector General of the National Science Foundation completed the investigation of IGES in November 2017 and concluded that there was no evidence to substantiate the allegations, the investigation was closed, and no further action would be taken.

== Bibliography ==
- A Billion Butterflies: A Life in Climate and Chaos Theory. (New York: St. Martin's Press, 2025). ISBN 978-1-250-28920-9
