= Antonio Divino Moura =

- Education: Massachusetts Institute of Technology
- Awards: International Meteorological Organization Prize
- Scientific career
- Fields: meteorology
- Workplaces: University of São Paulo; Brazilian Space Research Institute; International Research Institute for Climate and Society; Meteorological Institute of Brazil

Antonio Divino Moura, nascido em Ituiutaba-MG (21 de julho de 1945, e faleceu em 16 de abril de 2026). Graduado em Engenharia Elétrica, em 1969, pela Escola de Engenharia da UFMG e, em 1974, obteve o título de PhD no Instituto de Tecnologia de Massachusetts (MIT), nos Estados Unidos, onde recebeu o Prêmio Carl Gustav Rossby por sua tese, considerada a mais proeminente do ano na área de Meteorologia. . Was a vice-president of the World Meteorological Organization and director of the Meteorological Institute of Brazil (INMET). He was founding director general of the International Research Institute for Climate and Society at Columbia University (1996-2002) and professor of meteorology at the Brazilian Space Research Institute and the University of São Paulo. He won the Carl-Gustaf Rossby Award from the Massachusetts Institute of Technology for his PhD.

In 2018 the World Meteorological Organization named Antonio Divino Moura as the winner of its top scientific prize for outstanding work in meteorology and climatology and scientific research.
