= Isidoro Orlanski =

Argentine-American atmospheric physicist (born 1939)

- Born: 1939 (age 86–87); Rivera, Buenos Aires, Argentina
- Education: University of Buenos Aires; MIT
- Known for: mesoscale meteorology
- Scientific career
- Institutions: Geophysical Fluid Dynamics Laboratory; Princeton University
- Doctoral advisor: Jule Charney
- Other academic advisors: Joseph Smagorinsky

Isidoro Orlanski (born 1939) is an Argentine-American atmospheric physicist, meteorologist, and ocean scientist. He is known for his contributions to the dynamics of weather systems, ocean currents and mesoscale meteorology. He is an emeritus professor at Princeton University.

== Early life and education ==
Isidoro Orlanski was born in Rivera, Buenos Aires, in 1939 to Jewish immigrants Samuel and Sara Orlanski, who fled Wolkowysk, Poland during the early 20th century pogroms. With the help of the Jewish Colonization Association, which enabled Jewish immigrants from Eastern Europe to farm in Argentina, the Orlanski family settled in rural Argentina before moving to Buenos Aires in the early 1940s.

In 1959, Orlanski enrolled in the Faculty of Exact and Natural Sciences (Spanish: Facultad de Ciencias Exactas) at the University of Buenos Aires, where he studied physics. In 1964, Orlanski earned a degree in physics from University of Buenos Aires. In 1965, he received a grant to pursue graduate studies at the Massachusetts Institute of Technology. Orlanski completed his PhD in 1967 supervised by Jule Charney. His thesis, titled Instability of Frontal Waves, earned the Carl Gustav Rossby Award.

== Career ==
Orlanski moved to the Geophysical Fluid Dynamics Laboratory (GFDL), where he initially worked with Joseph Smagorinsky. The GFDL, under the leadership of Smagorinsky, was developing numerical models for weather forecasting and climate assessment. He relocated with the lab to Princeton University in New Jersey where he became a lecturer in Atmospheric and Oceanic Science.

By 1980, GFDL had grown to 134 staff members, with Orlanski being appointed the lab's Deputy Director. While on sabbatical in Argentina in 1985, Orlanski established an organization for numerical modeling that became the Centro de Investigaciones para el Mar y la Atmósfera (CIMA). Orlanski retired from GFDL in 2007 but continued teaching at Princeton University until 2017, retiring as a lecturer with the rank of Senior Meteorologist, Emeritus.

== Research ==
Orlanski worked in the field of mesoscale meteorology. He introduced the terms meso-alpha, meso-beta, and meso-gamma to classify the horizontal scales of atmospheric processes. The primary purpose of Orlanski’s classification of mesoscale phenomena was to assist modelers in designing limited-area models for mesoscale prediction. This framework was used in the design of field experiments for mesoscale observations, as well as in defining the spatial and temporal scales necessary for forecast models. It took over two decades for both numerical models and observational technologies to achieve an acceptable level of accuracy in this domain. Orlanski's research on boundary conditions for unbounded hyperbolic flows has applications beyond meteorology.

== Awards and honors ==
- Carl Gustav Rossby Award (MIT, 1968) – For best PhD thesis in the Atmospheric and Oceanic Sciences program.
- RAICES Prize (2011) – Awarded by the Ministry of Science, Technology and Innovation of Argentina for contributions to science and scientific development in Argentina.
- Fellow of the American Meteorological Society.

== Selected publications ==
- Orlanski, Isidoro (1968). "Instability of Frontal Waves". Journal of the Atmospheric Sciences. 25 (2): 178–200. Bibcode:1968JAtS...25..178O. doi:10.1175/1520-0469(1968)025<0178:IOFW>2.0.CO;2. ISSN 0022-4928.
- Orlanski, Isidoro; Bryan, Kirk (1969). "Formation of the thermocline step structure by large-amplitude internal gravity waves". Journal of Geophysical Research. 74 (28): 6975–6983. Bibcode:1969JGR....74.6975O. doi:10.1029/JC074i028p06975.
- Orlanski, Isidoro (1975). "A Rational Subdivision of Scales for Atmospheric Processes". Bulletin of the American Meteorological Society. 56 (5): 527–530. ISSN 0003-0007. JSTOR 26216020.
- Orlanski, Isidoro (1976). "A simple boundary condition for unbounded hyperbolic flows". Journal of Computational Physics. 21 (3): 251–269. Bibcode:1976JCoPh..21..251O. doi:10.1016/0021-9991(76)90023-1. ISSN 0021-9991.
- Orlanski, Isidoro; Katzfey, Jack (1991). "The Life Cycle of a Cyclone Wave in the Southern Hemisphere. Part I: Eddy Energy Budget". Journal of the Atmospheric Sciences. 48 (17): 1972–1998. Bibcode:1991JAtS...48.1972O. doi:10.1175/1520-0469(1991)048<1972:TLCOAC>2.0.CO;2. ISSN 0022-4928.
- Orlanski, Isidoro; Chang, Edmund K. M. (1993). "Ageostrophic Geopotential Fluxes in Downstream and Upstream Development of Baroclinic Waves". Journal of the Atmospheric Sciences. 50 (2): 212–225. Bibcode:1993JAtS...50..212O. doi:10.1175/1520-0469(1993)050<0212:AGFIDA>2.0.CO;2. ISSN 0022-4928.
- Orlanski, Isidoro; Solman, Silvina (2010). "The Mutual Interaction between External Rossby Waves and Thermal Forcing: The Subpolar Regions" (PDF). Journal of the Atmospheric Sciences. 67 (6): 1693–1711. Bibcode:2010JAtS...67.2018O. doi:10.1175/2010JAS3267.1.
