= Climate of the Philippines =

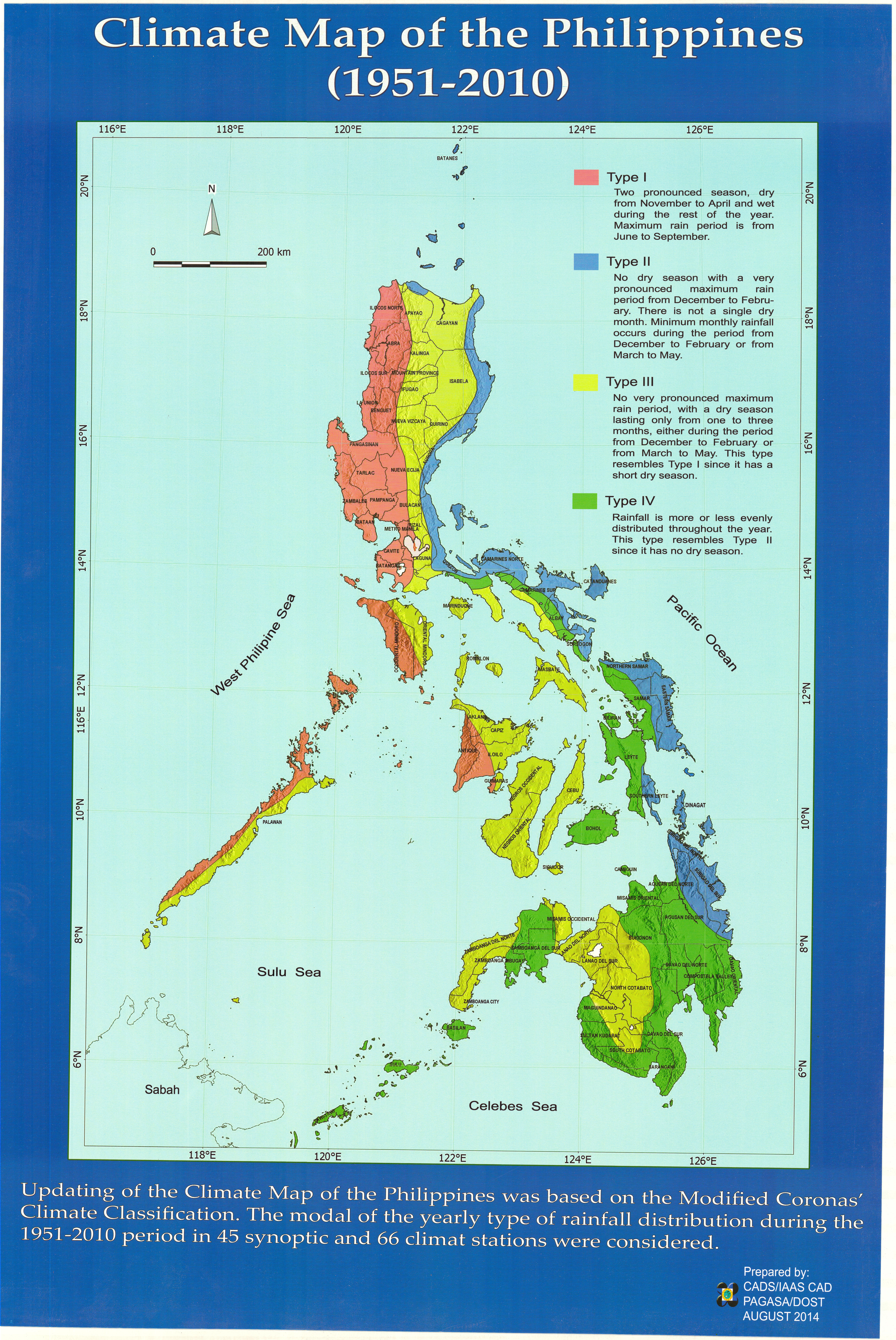
Climate map of the Philippines based on the Modified Coronas' Climate Classification, based on the type of rainfall distribution during the 1951-2021 period.

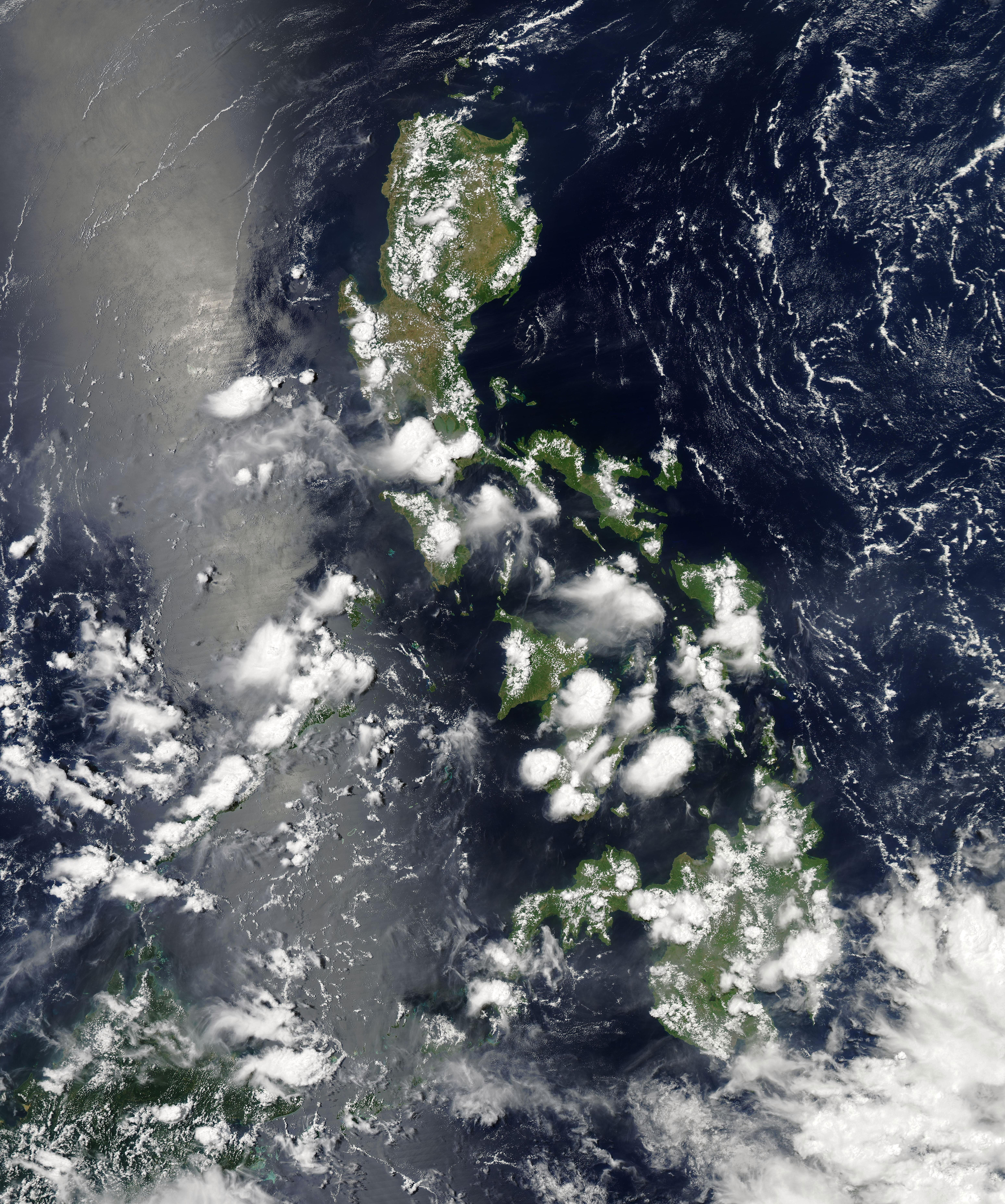
Evening thunderstorms bringing rain over the Philippines is common from March to September.

The Philippines has five types of climates: tropical rainforest, tropical monsoon, tropical savanna, humid subtropical and oceanic (the latter two are found in higher-altitude areas). The country overall is characterized by relatively high temperature, oppressive humidity and plenty of rainfall. There are two seasons in the country: the wet season and the dry season, based upon the amount of rainfall. This is also dependent on location in the country as some areas experience rain all throughout the year (see § Climate types). The warm months of the year are March through October; the winter monsoon brings cooler air from November to February. May is the warmest month, and January, the coolest.

Weather in the Philippines is monitored by the PAGASA (Philippine Atmospheric, Geophysical and Astronomical Services Administration).

== Rainfall ==
Monsoons are large-scale sea breezes which occur when the temperature on land is significantly warmer or cooler than the temperature of the ocean. Most summer monsoons or southwest monsoons (Filipino: Habagat) have a dominant westerly component and a strong tendency to ascend and produce copious amounts of rain (because of the condensation of water vapor in the rising air). The intensity and duration, however, are not uniform from year to year. Winter monsoons or northeast monsoons (Filipino: Amihan), by contrast, have a dominant easterly component and a strong tendency to diverge, subside and cause drought.

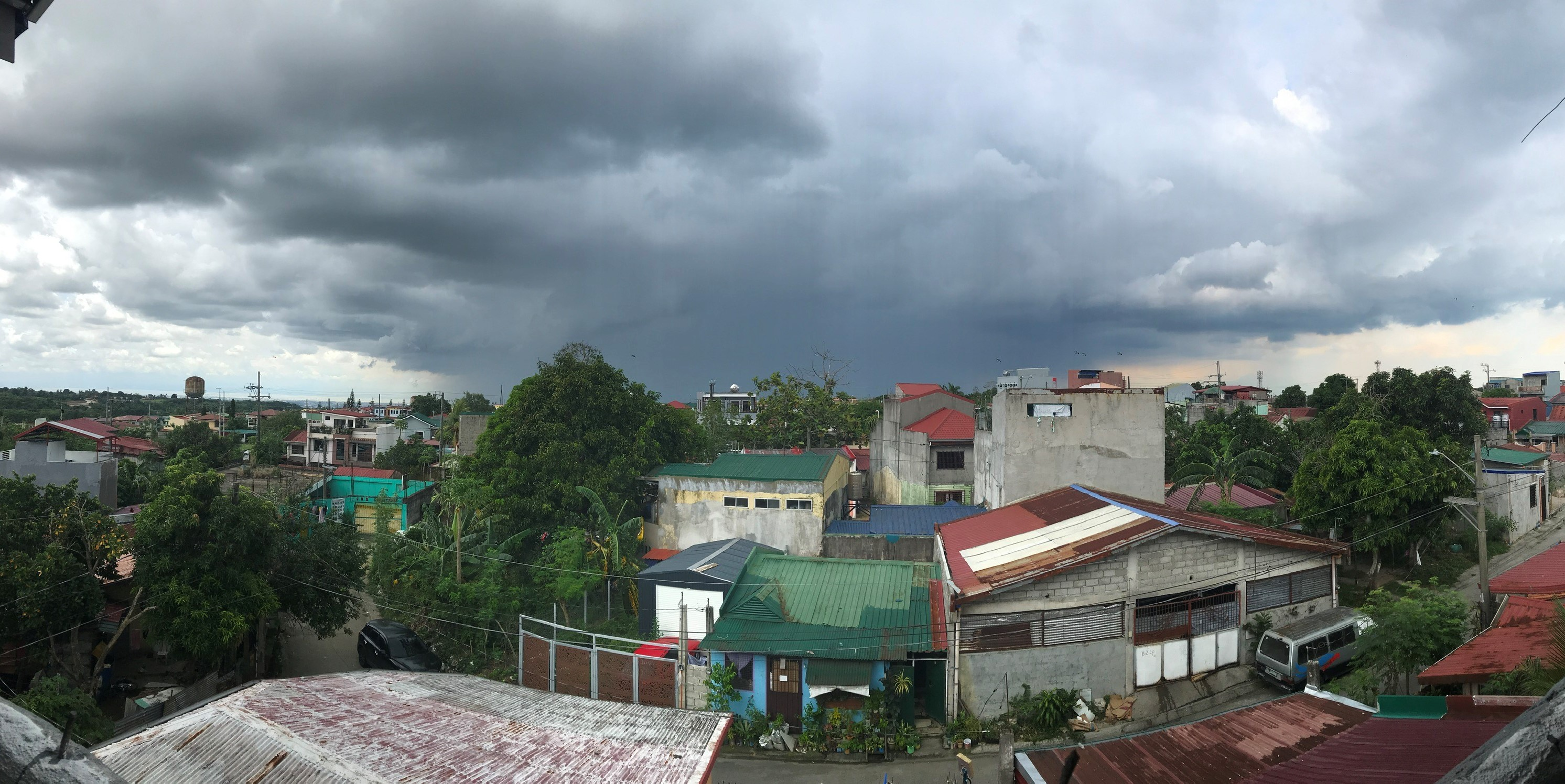
A classic summer thunderstorm in Silang, Cavite

The summer monsoon brings heavy rains to most of the archipelago from May to October. Annual average rainfall ranges from as much as 5,000 millimeters (197 in) in the mountainous east coast section of the country, to less than 1,000 millimeters (39 in) in some of the sheltered valleys. Monsoon rains, although hard and drenching, are not normally associated with high winds and waves.

At least 30 percent of the annual rainfall in the northern Philippines can be traced to tropical cyclones, while the southern islands receiving less than 10 percent of their annual rainfall from tropical cyclones. The wettest known tropical cyclone to impact the archipelago was the July 1911 cyclone, when the total precipitation for Baguio was distributed over the four days as: 14th – 879.8 mm (34.6 in), 15th – 733.6 mm (28.9 in), 16th – 424.9 mm (16.7 in), 17th – 200.4 mm (7.9 in); followed by extraordinary drought from October 1911 to May 1912, so that the annual amount of those two years were hardly noticeable.

== Typhoons ==
PAGASA's Tropical Cyclone Intensity Scale
Category	Sustained winds
Super typhoon (STY)	≥185 km/h ≥100 knots
Typhoon (TY)	118–184 km/h 64–99 knots
Severe tropical storm (STS)	89–117 km/h 48–63 knots
Tropical storm (TS)	62–88 km/h 34–47 knots
Tropical depression (TD)	≤61 km/h ≤33 knots

The Philippine archipelago sits across the typhoon belt, where dangerous storms occur from July through October. Climate change exacerbates the situation with typhoons in the Philippines. Bagyo is the Filipino term for any tropical cyclone in the Philippine Islands. From the statistics gathered by PAGASA from 1948 to 2004, around 28 storms and/or typhoons per year enter the Philippine Area of Responsibility (PAR) – the designated area assigned to PAGASA to monitor during weather disturbances. Of those that made landfall or crossed the Philippines, the average was nine per year. In 1993, a record nineteen typhoons made landfall in the country, making it the most in one year. The fewest per year were four during the years 1955, 1958, 1992, and 1997.

PAGASA categorizes typhoons into five types according to wind speed. Once a tropical cyclone enters the PAR, regardless of strength, it is given a local name for identification purposes by the media, government, and the general public.

=== Tropical Cyclone Wind Signals (TCWS) ===
PAGASA's Tropical Cyclone Wind Signals (TCWS)
Warning Signal	Meaning
TCWS #1	winds of 39–61 km/h (21–33 kn; 24–38 mph) are prevailing or expected to occur within 36 hours
TCWS #2	winds of 62–88 km/h (33–48 kn; 39–55 mph) are prevailing or expected to occur within 24 hours
TCWS #3	winds of 89–117 km/h (48–63 kn; 55–73 mph) are prevailing or expected to occur within 18 hours
TCWS #4	winds of 118–184 km/h (64–99 kn; 73–114 mph) are prevailing or expected to occur within 12 hours
TCWS #5	winds of 185 km/h (100 kn; 115 mph) or greater are prevailing or expected to occur within 12 hours

The Philippines has experienced a number of extremely damaging tropical cyclones, particularly typhoons with sustained winds of at least 185 km/h (115 mph; 100 kn; 51 m/s). For a long time, the Philippines used a four-level warning system to alert citizens of incoming tropical cyclones that would make landfall in the country, but the extensive damage and loss of life caused by Typhoon Haiyan (Yolanda) in 2013 made it inadequate. Because of this, the warning system was increased to five levels, and a Super Typhoon (STY) category was adopted in 2015. Initially, super typhoons were defined as typhoons with maximum sustained winds of more than 220 km/h (140 mph; 120 kn; 61 m/s), but the threshold was lowered to those of at least 185 km/h (115 mph; 100 kn; 51 m/s) after PAGASA revised its system of wind signals in 2022.

=== Notable typhoons to hit the Philippines ===
This list only includes super typhoons that made landfall in the country at powerful wind speeds and intensities, and wrought extensive damage at the same time. Several weaker storms have made landfall in the country, although they produced extensive damage and high losses of life, such as tropical storms Ondoy and Sendong, both of which accumulated over 400 deaths.

==== Typhoon Angela (Rosing, 1995) ====
In November 1995, Typhoon Angela, a catastrophic Category 5-equivalent super typhoon, known locally as Rosing, made landfall in the province of Catanduanes and skirted throughout the island of Luzon. Bicol Region and Metro Manila were the hardest hit areas, and signal #4 was even raised in the latter, a feat that would not happen in the area for 25 years. One-minute sustained winds reached speeds of 290 km/h (180 mph). Rosing took 936 lives and caused over 10 billion pesos in damage. It was considered the most powerful typhoon to ever hit Metro Manila in terms of wind speeds.

==== Typhoon Bopha (Pablo, 2012) ====
The most powerful typhoon to ever strike the island of Mindanao, typhoon Bopha, locally known as Pablo, made landfall in eastern Mindanao as a powerful category 5-equivalent super typhoon, with one-minute measured sustained winds reaching speeds of 280 km/h (170 mph). Davao Region was one of the worst hit areas, particularly Davao Oriental, where the typhoon made its first land interaction. Over 42 billion pesos (US$1.04 billion) was recorded over time, making it the costliest storm to impact Mindanao, as well as the whole country, at that time. At least 1,067 people died and 834 people were reported missing. Most of the damage was caused by storm surges and winds.

==== Typhoon Haiyan (Yolanda, 2013) ====
One of the most powerful storms to make landfall anywhere in the world in terms of wind speeds, Typhoon Haiyan, locally known as Yolanda, made landfall in several areas across the country in November of 2013 as a Category 5-equivalent super typhoon. The islands of Leyte and Samar were the hardest hit by the typhoon, especially the city of Tacloban, where the storm's eyewall passed through. More than 6,300 people died from its storm surges and powerful winds, with damages up to 90 billion pesos, making it the deadliest and most destructive typhoon to hit the country on record. In addition, over 1,000 went missing, and nearly 20,000 were injured. One-minute sustained winds reached up to 315 km/h (196 mph; 170 kn; 88 m/s), cementing Yolanda (Haiyan) as the strongest storm in history in terms of reliably measured wind speeds, until it was surpassed by Hurricane Patricia of the eastern Pacific region in 2015.

==== Typhoon Goni (Rolly, 2020) ====
The most powerful tropical cyclone to make landfall anywhere in the world in terms of one-minute measured wind speeds, Typhoon Goni, locally known as Rolly, made landfall in Catanduanes as a powerful Category 5-equivalent super typhoon, and was one of the series of storms that made landfall in the Philippines between October and November 2020. At landfall, one-minute measured wind speeds were at 315 km/h (196 mph; 170 kn; 88 m/s). Bicol Region was the worst hit by the typhoon, and signal #4 was once again raised in Metro Manila, the first time since the above-mentioned Angela (Rosing). Evacuation processes were also complicated due to the COVID-19 pandemic, as health and safety protocols were implemented at the time of impact to prevent the spread of the virus. Damages from the storm reached over 20 billion pesos (US$369 million).

== Climate types ==
There are four recognized climate types in the Philippines, and they are based on the distribution of rainfall (See the Philippine Climate Map at the top). (Note: This classification was first established by Coronas 1920, pp. 68–72 and then slightly modified by PAGASA (Flores & Balagot 1969; Kintanar 1984).) They are described as follows:

Type I
Two pronounced seasons: dry from November to April and wet during the rest of the year.

Type II
No dry season with a pronounced rainfall from November to January.

Type III
Seasons are not very pronounced, relatively dry from November to April, and wet during the rest of the year.

Type IV
Rainfall is more or less evenly distributed throughout the year.

Climate: Type I
Manila
		Jan	Feb	Mar	Apr	May	Jun	Jul	Aug	Sep	Oct	Nov	Dec	Year
Average high	°C °F	29.8; 85.6	30.6; 87.1	32.3; 90.1	33.7; 92.7	33.8; 92.8	32.1; 89.8	31.0; 87.8	30.5; 86.9	30.6; 87.1	30.9; 87.6	30.5; 86.9	29.7; 85.5	31.3; 88.3
Average mean	°C °F	25.7; 78.3	26.1; 79.0	27.5; 81.5	28.8; 83.8	29.3; 84.7	28.3; 82.9	27.5; 81.5	27.3; 81.1	27.2; 81.0	27.3; 81.1	26.8; 80.2	25.9; 78.6	27.3; 81.1
Average low	°C °F	21.6; 70.9	21.6; 70.9	22.7; 72.9	24.0; 75.2	24.9; 76.8	24.6; 76.3	24.1; 75.4	24.1; 75.4	23.9; 75.0	23.7; 74.7	23.1; 73.6	22.2; 72.0	23.4; 74.1
Average rainfall	mm in	17; 0.7	8; 0.3	13; 0.5	26; 1.0	125; 4.9	273; 10.7	407; 16.0	441; 17.4	346; 13.6	193; 7.6	135; 5.3	63; 2.5	2,047; 81
climate-data.org February 2016

Climate: Type II
Borongan, Eastern Samar
		Jan	Feb	Mar	Apr	May	Jun	Jul	Aug	Sep	Oct	Nov	Dec	Year
Average high	°C °F	29.1; 84.4	29.3; 84.7	30.1; 86.2	31.1; 88.0	31.8; 89.2	32.1; 89.8	32.0; 89.6	32.2; 90.0	32.3; 90.1	31.5; 88.7	30.5; 86.9	29.7; 85.5	31.0; 87.8
Average mean	°C °F	25.8; 78.4	25.8; 78.4	26.4; 79.5	27.1; 80.8	27.7; 81.9	27.9; 82.2	27.8; 82.0	27.9; 82.2	28.0; 82.4	27.4; 81.3	26.7; 80.1	26.3; 79.3	27.1; 80.8
Average low	°C °F	22.5; 72.5	22.4; 72.3	22.7; 72.9	23.2; 73.8	23.7; 74.7	23.7; 74.7	23.6; 74.5	23.7; 74.7	23.7; 74.7	23.3; 73.9	23.0; 73.4	22.9; 73.2	23.2; 73.8
Average rainfall	mm in	565; 22.2	394; 15.5	308; 12.1	262; 10.3	315; 12.4	221; 8.7	218; 8.6	201; 7.9	194; 7.6	290; 11.4	508; 20.0	633; 24.9	4,109; 162
climate-data.org February 2016

Climate: Type III
Cebu City
		Jan	Feb	Mar	Apr	May	Jun	Jul	Aug	Sep	Oct	Nov	Dec	Year
Average high	°C °F	30.2; 86.4	30.4; 86.7	31.4; 88.5	32.5; 90.5	33.0; 91.4	32.3; 90.1	31.9; 89.4	31.9; 89.4	31.7; 89.1	31.5; 88.7	31.3; 88.3	30.7; 87.3	31.6; 88.9
Average mean	°C °F	26.3; 79.3	26.5; 79.7	27.1; 80.8	28.1; 82.6	28.6; 83.5	28.2; 82.8	27.9; 82.2	27.9; 82.2	27.7; 81.9	27.5; 81.5	27.4; 81.3	26.9; 80.4	27.5; 81.5
Average low	°C °F	22.5; 72.5	22.6; 72.7	22.8; 73.0	23.7; 74.7	24.3; 75.7	24.1; 75.4	23.9; 75.0	24.0; 75.2	23.7; 74.7	23.6; 74.5	23.5; 74.3	23.1; 73.6	23.5; 74.3
Average rainfall	mm in	103; 4.1	79; 3.1	59; 2.3	65; 2.6	115; 4.5	176; 6.9	192; 7.6	164; 6.5	174; 6.9	193; 7.6	166; 6.5	121; 4.8	1,607; 63
climate-data.org February 2016

Climate: Type IV
General Santos
		Jan	Feb	Mar	Apr	May	Jun	Jul	Aug	Sep	Oct	Nov	Dec	Year
Average high	°C °F	32.2; 90.0	32.5; 90.5	33.1; 91.6	33.4; 92.1	32.3; 90.1	31.4; 88.5	31.0; 87.8	31.1; 88.0	31.5; 88.7	31.9; 89.4	31.2; 88.2	32.1; 89.8	32.1; 89.8
Average mean	°C °F	26.8; 80.2	27.0; 80.6	27.4; 81.3	27.9; 82.2	27.5; 81.5	26.9; 80.4	26.5; 79.7	26.5; 79.7	26.8; 80.2	27.1; 80.8	27.1; 80.8	26.9; 80.4	27.0; 80.6
Average low	°C °F	21.4; 70.5	21.5; 70.7	21.7; 71.1	22.4; 72.3	22.7; 72.9	22.4; 72.3	22.0; 71.6	22.0; 71.6	22.2; 72.0	22.3; 72.1	22.0; 71.6	21.8; 71.2	22.0; 71.6
Average rainfall	mm in	68; 2.7	69; 2.7	47; 1.9	57; 2.2	108; 4.3	118; 4.6	110; 4.3	93; 3.7	84; 3.3	113; 4.4	98; 3.9	87; 3.4	1,052; 41
climate-data.org February 2016

== Temperature ==
The average year-round temperature measured from all the weather stations in the Philippines, except Baguio, is 26.6 °C (79.9 °F). Cooler days are usually felt in the month of January with temperature averaging at 25.5 °C (77.9 °F) and the warmest days, in the month of May with a mean of 28.3 °C (82.9 °F). Elevation factors significantly in the variation of temperature in the Philippines. In Baguio, with an elevation of 1,500 m (4,900 ft) above sea level, the mean average is 18.3 °C (64.9 °F) or cooler by about 4.3 °C (8 °F). In 1915, a one-year study was conducted by William H. Brown of the Philippine Journal of Science on top of Mount Banahaw at 2,100 m (6,900 ft) elevation. The mean temperature measured was 18.6 °C (65.5 °F), a difference of 10 °C (18 °F) from the lowland mean temperature.

Philippines monthly average temperature trend from 1991 to 2020 (°C)
Category	Jan	Feb	Mar	Apr	May	Jun	Jul	Aug	Sep	Oct	Nov	Dec
Min	20.67	20.57	21.09	21.98	22.55	22.35	22.03	22.07	21.97	21.76	21.64	21.31
Mean	24.72	24.88	25.71	26.68	27.02	26.47	25.94	25.92	25.9	25.83	25.65	25.21
Max	28.82	29.24	30.38	31.42	31.54	30.65	29.9	29.82	29.87	29.96	29.72	29.16
Precipitation (mm)	136.93	96.05	92.56	97.66	188.95	248.37	291.02	310.68	281.05	280.74	230.51	206.84

== Humidity ==
Relative humidity is high in the Philippines. A high amount of moisture in the air makes hot temperatures feel hotter. This quantity of moisture is due to different factors, including evaporation from the seas that surround the country on all sides, the different prevailing winds in the different seasons of the year, and abundant tropical rain. The first may be considered a general cause of the great humidity, which is generally observed in all the islands throughout the year. The last two may influence the different degrees of humidity for the different months of the year and for the different regions of the archipelago.

== Seasons ==
The climate of the country is divided into two main seasons:

1. the rainy season, roughly from June to October; associated with the Southwest Monsoon (Hanging Habagat). (Note: The onset of both the southwest monsoon (known as Habagat) and the rainy season in the Philippines typically occurs between May and June. The official declaration is made by the Philippine Atmospheric, Geophysical and Astronomical Services Administration (PAGASA) after specific rainfall criteria have been met in key areas of the country. Both Southwest Monsoon and the rainy season typically terminates in the Philippines between late September and mid-October, and officially declares the end of the season when conditions change.) In 2025, the Philippine Atmospheric, Geophysical and Astronomical Services Administration (PAGASA) officially declared the start of the rainy season on June 3.
2. the dry season, roughly from November to May. The dry season may be subdivided further into (a) the cool dry season, roughly from November to February, associated with the Northeast Monsoon (Hanging Amihan) (Note: The onset of both the Northeast Monsoon (Amihan) and the cool dry season in the Philippines typically occurs between October and November. The official start is declared by the Philippine Atmospheric, Geophysical and Astronomical Services Administration (PAGASA) based on specific meteorological conditions. Both the northeast monsoon (or Amihan) and the cool dry season in the Philippines typically ends between March and April, signaling the beginning of the country's warm and dry season. The Philippine Atmospheric, Geophysical and Astronomical Services Administration (PAGASA) officially declares the termination based on specific meteorological conditions.) and (b) the hot dry season, roughly from March to May. The months of April and May, the hot and dry months when schools are on their long breaks between academic years, are commonly called "summer" (after the summer season which lasts from June to August in more temperate countries, which is also the country’s Southwest Monsoon period).

Months	November–February	March–May	June–August	September–October
Rainfall	Dry		Wet	
Temperature	Cool	Hot		
Season	Cool Dry	Hot Dry	Rainy	

== Climate change ==
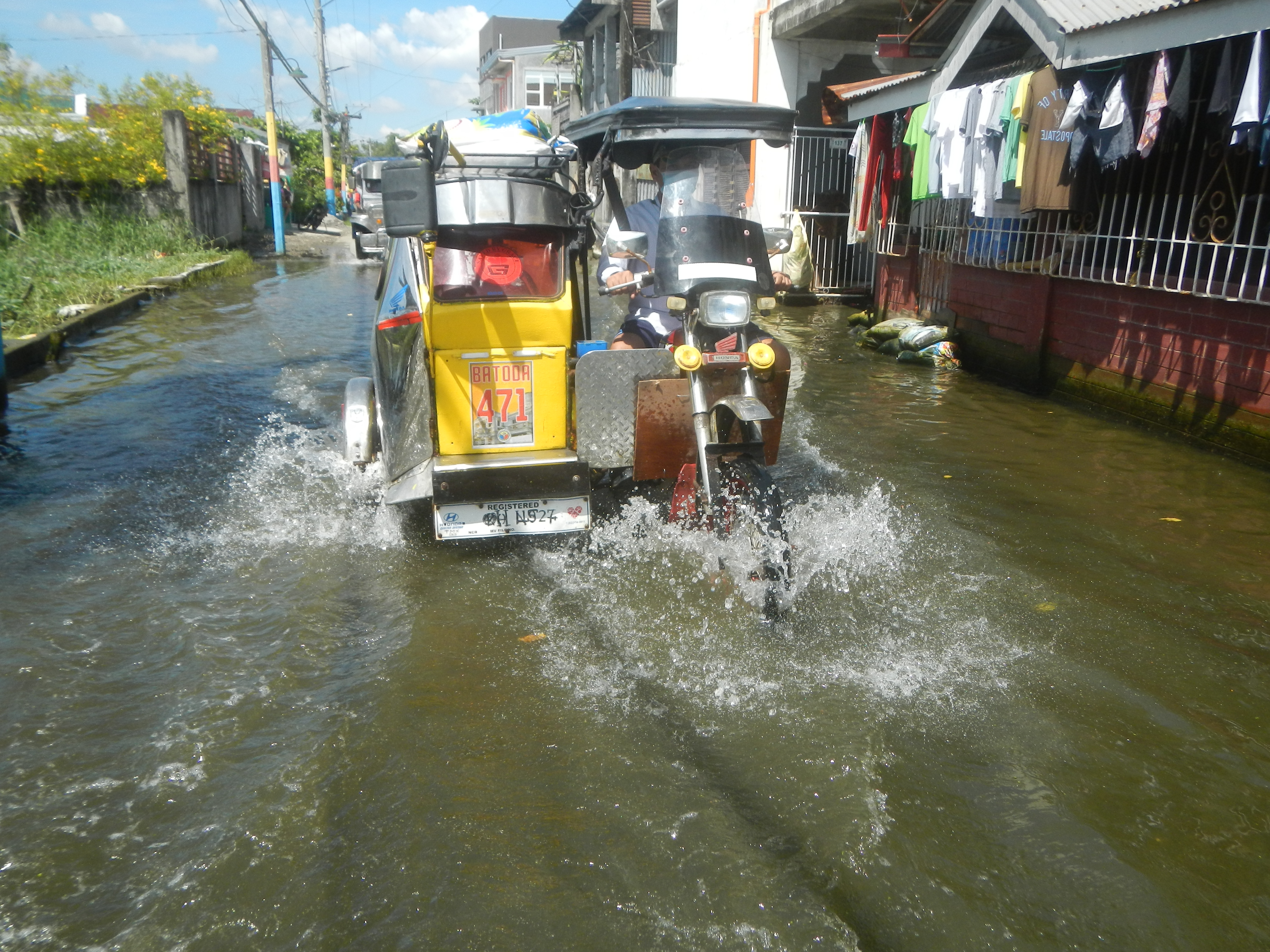
Both floods and droughts are predicted to increase.

Climate change is having serious impacts in the Philippines such as increased frequency and severity of natural disasters, sea level rise, extreme rainfall, resource shortages, and environmental degradation. All of these impacts together have greatly affected the Philippines' agriculture, water, infrastructure, human health, and coastal ecosystems and they are projected to continue having devastating damages to the economy and society of the Philippines.

According to the UN Office for the Coordination of Humanitarian Affairs (OCHA), the Philippines is one of the most disaster-prone countries in the world. The archipelago is situated along the Pacific Ocean's typhoon belt, leaving the country vulnerable to around 20 typhoons each year, a quarter of which are destructive. The December 2021 typhoon known colloquially as Typhoon Odette caused almost one billion US$ (₱47.6 billion) in infrastructure, housing, and agricultural damages and displaced 114,943 people. The United Nations Development Programme (UNDP) reported in 2022 that Typhoon Odette affected the lives of 9.9 million people. More tragically, the physical and economic repercussions of Typhoon Odette led to the death of 407 people as of December 2022.

In addition to the Philippines' close proximity to the Pacific Ocean's typhoon belt, the Philippines is also located within the "Pacific Ring of Fire" which makes the country prone to recurrent earthquakes and volcanic eruptions. Compounding these issues, the impacts of climate change, such as accelerated sea level rise, exacerbate the state's high susceptibility to natural disasters, like flooding and landslides. Aside from geography, climate change impacts regions with a history of colonization more intensely than regions without a history of colonization. Colonized regions experience the repercussions of climate change most jarringly "because of their high dependence on natural resources, their geographical and climatic conditions and their limited capacity to effectively adapt to a changing climate." Since low-income countries have a history of colonialism and resource exploitation, their environment lacks the diversity necessary to prevail against natural disasters. A lack of biodiversity reduces the resilience of a specific region, leaving them more susceptible to natural disasters and the effects of climate change. With its history of Spanish colonization, the Philippines is not environmentally nor economically equipped to overcome issues it is currently dealing with, such as natural disasters and climate change. This inability to recover exacerbates the problem, creating a cycle of environmental and economic devastation in the country.

The Philippines, an archipelago of over 7,000 islands, is exceptionally vulnerable to the impacts of climate change. Rising sea levels threaten coastal communities, leading to increased flooding and displacement. Extreme weather events, such as typhoons, are becoming more frequent and intense, causing widespread destruction and economic losses. Changes in rainfall patterns disrupt agricultural cycles, impacting food security and livelihoods. The country's rich biodiversity is also at risk, as changing temperatures and ocean acidification affect ecosystems and marine life. Addressing climate change in the Philippines requires a multifaceted approach, including mitigation efforts to reduce greenhouse gas emissions, adaptation strategies to build resilience, and international cooperation to support vulnerable nations.

== Sources ==
- Coronas, José (1920). The Climate and Weather of the Philippines, 1903 – 1918. Manila Observatory: Bureau of Philippines. Archived from the original on December 22, 2015.
- Flores, J. F.; Balagot, V. F. (1969). Arakawa, Hidetoshi (ed.). Ch. 3: Climate of the Philippines. World Survey of Climatology. Vol. 8: Climates of Northern and Eastern Asia. Elsevier. ISBN 978-0444407047.
- Kintanar, R. L. (1984). Climate of the Philippines. PAGASA.
