= Eric Eady =

British meteorologist

- Born: Eric Thomas Eady; 5 September 1915; Ealing, London, England
- Died: 26 March 1966 (aged 50); Royal Surrey County Hospital, Guildford, Surrey, England
- Education: Imperial College London
- Occupation: Meteorologist
- Known for: Eady Model of baroclinic instability
- Spouse: Marjorie Currie (m. 1949)

Eric Thomas Eady (5 September 1915 – 26 March 1966) was a British meteorology researcher and author of the Eady Model of baroclinic instability, modelling baroclinic generation of weather systems.

== Biography ==
Eady was born in Ealing and attended Ealing, Hammersmith and West London College. He earned a scholarship to Christ's College, Cambridge, where he received a BSc in mathematics in 1935. In 1937 he became a weather forecaster in the UK Meteorological Office. In 1946, he resigned from the office to start a PhD in mathematics at Imperial College London. His 1948 thesis was titled The theory of development in dynamical meteorology, which was an early work on atmospheric instability and the development of weather systems. Eady widened his interests to include oceanography in his later career.

In his later years, he became depressed by his career and isolated himself from his social circle. In 1966, he died at Royal Surrey County Hospital, age 50, after an overdose of sleeping pills.
