= Peter Smagorinsky =

American academic

- Education: Kenyon College (BA, 1974), University of Chicago (MAT, 1977; PhD, 1989)
- Scientific career
- Fields: English and literacy education
- Workplaces: University of Oklahoma, University of Georgia

Peter Smagorinsky is an American educator, researcher, and professor emeritus at the University of Georgia. He held the title of Distinguished Research Professor of English Education.

Following high school, Smagorinsky received his Bachelor of Arts in English literature from Kenyon College in Gambier, Ohio, in 1974. He received a Master of Arts in Teaching in English Education from the University of Chicago in 1977. During his career as a high school English teacher, Smagorinsky continued his education at the University of Chicago, receiving his Ph.D. in English Education in 1989, advised by George Hillocks.

He joined the faculty of the University of Georgia in 1998 in 1998 after having taught at the University of Oklahoma for eight years. In 2000 Smagorinsky was promoted to full professor, and in 2011 he received the title of Distinguished Research Professor. He retired in 2020.

He is one of the five children of Margaret Smagorinsky, the Weather Bureau's first female statistician, and meteorologist Joseph Smagorinsky.
