= Bimla Buti =

Indian physicist (1933–2024)

- Born: 19 September 1933
- Died: 24 February 2024 (aged 90)
- Citizenship: Indian
- Education: University of Delhi; University of Chicago
- Known for: Physicist
- Scientific career
- Fields: Physics, Plasma Physics
- Workplaces: INSA
- Thesis: Relativistic Effects on Plasma Oscillations and Two-Stream Instability (1962)
- Doctoral advisor: Subrahmanyan Chandrasekhar

Bimla Buti (19 September 1933 – 24 February 2024) was an Indian physicist who specialized in the field of plasma physics. She was the first Indian woman Physicist Fellow of Indian National Science Academy(INSA). In 1994, she was awarded INSA-Vainu Bappu Award.

== Education ==
Buti obtained a BSc (Hons) and a MSc degree in Physics from University of Delhi. She was admitted to the University of Chicago for doctoral studies. She worked under the supervision of Subrahmanyan Chandrasekhar and in 1962 she earned a PhD degree in plasma physics.

== Career ==
After earning her doctorate, Buti returned to India and took up a teaching role at Delhi University. Two years later, she went back to the US to work at Goddard Space Flight Center.

In 1968 Buti came back to India and took a job at the Indian Institute of Technology, Delhi. Vikram Sarabhai, the then Director of Physical Research Laboratory (PRL), invited Buti to join PRL, where Buti served from 1970 to 1993 as Associate Professor, Professor, Senior Professor and Dean of Faculty.

At PRL, Buti started a new section for the experimental Plasma Physics programme. Shortly thereafter, this group was spun off as a separate institution known as Institute of Plasma Research under the aegis of the Indian Department of Atomic Energy.

Between 1985 and 2003, Buti was the Director of Plasma Physics at the International Centre for Theoretical Physics, Trieste, Italy.

Buti, in her career, published a large number of research papers and edited four books. Between 1977 and 1983, she was an Associate Editor of IEEE Transactions on Plasma Science, USA. She founded Plasma Science Society and worked there as its president between 1992 and 1993.

Buti died on 24 February 2024, at the age of 90.

== Awards and honours ==
Buti has received the following awards during her career—

- Vikram Sarabhai Award for Planetary Sciences (1977)
- Jawarharlal Nehru Birth Centenary Lectureship Award, 1993
- INSA-Vainu Bappu Award for Astrophysics, 1994
- Professional Achievement Citation Award of University of Chicago, USA (1996)
- US Medal for Fundamental Contributions in the Physics of Nonlinear Waves and Chaos (2010)
- Fellow of TWAS
- Fellow of National Academy of Sciences (India)
- Fellow of American Physical Society
- Fellow of the Indian National Science Academy
