= David Tritton =

English physicist (1935–1998)

David John Tritton
- Born: 26 July 1935; Slough, England
- Died: 24 April 1998 (aged 62); Austin, Texas
- Citizenship: British
- Education: University of Cambridge
- Scientific career
- Fields: Fluid dynamics
- Workplaces: University of Newcastle upon Tyne
- Doctoral advisor: Alan A. Townsend

David John Tritton (26 July 1935 – 24 April 1998) was an English physicist who specialised in fluid dynamics.

Tritton was born in Slough on 26 July 1935. He was educated at the University of Cambridge and obtained his PhD with a dissertation on "Experiments on Flow past Cylinders and Free Convection", supervised by Alan A. Townsend. Subsequently, he worked at the University of Newcastle upon Tyne in the UK. He was a visiting professor at the University of Texas at Austin when he died on 24 April 1998.

Tritton is well known for his textbook Physical Fluid Dynamics, first published in 1977, with a second edition in 1988.
