= Roman Kintanar =

Filipino meteorologist (1929–2007)

- Born: June 13, 1929; Cebu City, Philippine Islands
- Died: May 6, 2007 (aged 77); Quezon City, Philippines
- Scientific career
- Fields: Meteorology

Roman Lucero Kintanar Ph.D. (June 13, 1929 – May 6, 2007) was a scientist in the field of meteorology.

== Biography ==
Kintanar was born in Cebu City, Philippines. Kintanar received his Bachelor of Science in Physics at the University of the Philippines in 1951 before earning a Ph.D. at the University of Texas. He was a member of the Upsilon Sigma Phi fraternity.

=== Career ===
Kintanar started out as a weather observer in 1948. On August 1, 1958, he was appointed as the Director of the Weather Bureau, later named the Philippine Atmospheric, Geophysical and Astronomical Services Administration (PAGASA), at the age of 29, the youngest person to hold such a position in Filipino Government service, and stayed in that position for almost 40 years. During his tenure as the head of PAGASA, Kintanar was appointed Third Vice-President of WMO in 1978 before becoming the President of the eighth World Meteorological Organization (WMO) congress in 1979, and was re-elected for another four-year term as the President of the WMO on 1983.

=== Death and afterward ===
Kintanar died of cancer on May 6, 2007, at his residence in Quezon City. An asteroid (6636 Kintanar) was named after him in 2007 for his contributions to the science of meteorology.

== Awards ==
- 1978: Parangal ng PAGASA award
- 1980: Lingkod Bayan Award, Career Executive Service Board
- 1981: Public Service Award, Office of the President
- 1995: International Meteorological Organization Prize
- 1996: Presidential Citation Award by the then President Fidel V. Ramos
- 2007: Philippine Legion of Honor with the Rank of Grand Officer (Marangal na Pinuno) for his work in various international cooperations for tropical cyclone and earthquake disaster mitigation programs by President Gloria Arroyo
