= Margaret Smagorinsky =

American meteorologist

- Born: Margaret F Knoepfel; December 23, 1915; New York City, New York, United States
- Died: November 14, 2011 (aged 95); Hillsborough, New Jersey, United States
- Education: Brooklyn College; University of Virginia; New York University
- Spouse: Joseph Smagorinsky
- Scientific career
- Fields: Meteorology
- Workplaces: Railroad Retirement Board; Princeton University

Margaret Smagorinsky (23 December 1915 – 14 November 2011) was an American statistician, computer programmer, and weather technologist. She was the first female statistician hired by the United States Weather Bureau.

== Early life ==
Smagorinsky was born in Brooklyn, New York, as the second of four daughters of Anne and George Knoepfel. She attended Bay Ridge High School in Brooklyn.

Smagorinsky was the first member of her family to attend college when she attended Brooklyn College. She graduated at age 19 with a degree in mathematics, and taught school in a one-room schoolhouse in Ashland, New York, for four years.

== Statistics career ==
Smagorinsky took the civil service exam for a statistical clerk in the US. She was offered a job at the Railroad Retirement Board in Washington, D.C., where she worked as a statistician processing paperwork for employees looking to enter the civil service.

At age 26, Smagorinsky joined the Weather Bureau, where she was the first woman statistician. After being sent to New York University for additional coursework, she met Joseph Smagorinsky in a graduate statistics course. He was 8 years her junior, and they married on May 29, 1948.

Smagorinsky had five children: Anne, Peter, Teresa, Julia, and Frederick. She left full-time government employment after her first child was born in 1951.

Smagorinsky, in supporting her husband's work, processed data and programmed the ENIAC (Electronic Numerical Integrator And Computer). In April 1950, a group of meteorologists at New Jersey's Institute for Advanced Study successfully produced the first weather forecast using the ENIAC and numerical prediction techniques. Smagorinsky is cited as a programmer of computers for 5-day weather forecast models created by the Geophysical Fluid Dynamics Laboratory at the National Oceanic and Atmospheric Administration.

== Publications ==
- The Tigers of Princeton University: A Campus Safari and Photo Essay (1992)
- Some Legends and Lore of Princeton University: Historical Sketches (1993)
- The Regalia of Princeton University: Pomp, Circumstance,and Accoutrements of Academia (1994)
