= Indian Meteorological Society =

Non-profit organization

The Indian Meteorological Society is an Indian non-profit organisation that promotes the advancement, dissemination, and application of meteorology and related sciences.

The society was established in 1956.
