= Bjerknes =

Bjerknes may refer to:

- Carl Anton Bjerknes (1825–1903), Norwegian mathematician and physicist
- Vilhelm Bjerknes (1862–1951), Norwegian physicist and meteorologist, son of Carl Anton
- Jacob Bjerknes (1897–1975), Norwegian-American meteorologist, son of Vilhelm
- Bjerknes (lunar crater), named in honour of Vilhelm
