= Erik Björkdal =

Swedish meteorologist

- Born: 21 February 1899; Vimmerby Municipality
- Died: 30 May 1952 (aged 53); Stockholm
- Alma mater: Uppsala University; Bergen school
- Occupation: Meteorologist
- Employer: Norwegian Meteorological Institute (1920–1949); Swedish Meteorological and Hydrological Institute (1949–1952)

Erik Anton Björkdal was a Swedish meteorologist who studied at the Bergen School of Meteorology where the theory of fronts was developed. His contribution was mainly in the field of dynamic meteorology. Among his works, mention must be made of the correlation between the tropopause geopotential and the troposphere temperature.

== Biography ==
Björkdal was born on 21 February 1899 in Vimmerby, Sweden. After high school, he was admitted to the University of Uppsala and graduated in 1920. However, in 1919 he was employed by Vilhelm Bjerknes as an assistant at the Bergen School of Meteorology. After graduation, he was transferred to the Norwegian Meteorological Institute in Oslo where he became Division Chief in 1937.

During the Second World War, he replaced the director of the institute, Dr. Th. Hesselberg, who was absent for a period of time because of health problems. He eventually became head of meteorology at the Swedish Meteorological and Hydrological Institute in Stockholm in 1949.

Björkdal was an active collaborator at the international level with the World Meteorological Organization (WMO), among others with the Synoptic Meteorological Commission, of which he was vice-president from 1951, and with the Telecommunications Subcommittee, of which he was president from 1949.

Björkdal died on May 30, 1952, in Stockholm.
