= Johan Sandström =

Swedish oceanographer and meteorologist

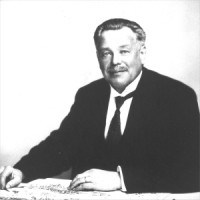
- Born: 6 June 1874; Degerfors, Sweden
- Died: 12 January 1947 (aged 72); Bromma, Sweden
- Known for: Sandström's theorem
- Scientific career
- Fields: oceanography meteorology
- Workplaces: Swedish Meteorological and Hydrological Institute

Johan Wilhelm Sandström (6 June 1874, Degerfors, Västerbotten County – 12 January 1947, Bromma, Stockholm County), usually cited as J. W. Sandström, was a Swedish oceanographer and meteorologist. He is most famously known for conducting a series of classical experiments at Bornö Marine Research Station in Sweden published in 1908. His experiments concerned themselves with the causes of ocean currents, particularly those found in fjords.

== Biography ==
Sandström is the son of carpenter Jonas Anton Sandström and Greta Magdalena Sjögren. He went to Degerfors Elementary School but upon the death of his father, his mother moved the family to Sundsvall, where Sandström worked in a sawmill while being tutored. Thanks to local benefactors, he entered a Stockholm technical school, and although he never received an official diploma, he excelled in mathematics and frequented scientific circles.

In 1899, Sandström joined the national meteorological service where he met Vilhelm Bjerknes, founder of the Bergen School of Meteorology, who changed his career. The professor of mathematical physics in Stockholm was working on weather forecasting and the theory of the generalized hydrodynamic circulation in the late 1890s. With a grant from the government, Bjerknes engaged Sandström in 1899 to assist him in the study of the relationship between atmospheric pressure and storms.

In a series of publications, Sandström analyzed the general atmospheric circulation and developed the graphic predictive techniques for which he was known. When Bjerknes' grant ended, he was hired by Otto Pettersson as his main assistant at the Swedish Hydrographic and Biological Commission. Pettersson was the chief scientist of the commission's research vessel fleet. Sandström also received an offer from Fridtjof Nansen in Bergen to help with the book Lehrbuch der Cos-Physen Physik by Svante Arrhenius (1903), to write the part on air masses and dynamic meteorology.

Thanks to the grants from Washington's Carnegie Institution, Bjerknes re-engaged Sandström for a new and ambitious project in 1906. The following year, he went with Bjerknes to Oslo where they dealt with the physics and mathematics of the subject. In 1908, Sandström was hired as technical manager of the new Hydrographic Agency in Stockholm, despite the lack of a diploma, with the help of Bjerknes' recommendation and his own publications.

In 1913, he often argued with Nils Ekholm about the value of Bjerknes' meteorological work for real-life applications. However, as sailors and farmers started to ask for more weather information, he soon became the director of the new Meteorological Office within the agency in 1919.

During the 1920s, aviation began to be an important customer for meteorological data, bringing new data and organizational changes. There was also an increased use of telecommunication technologies, including telegraphy and broadcasting. The Stockholm Meteorological and Hydrological Agency also needed to expand its hydrological functions. Sandström then began to study the Gulf Stream, with Pettersson and Ekholm, for its influences on the climate.

In 1929, Sandström led an expedition to the Arctic Ocean funded by the state and private foundations. In addition to expeditions and a number of personal boat trips in the Arctic, Sandström traveled several times in winter to Bergen to meet with Professor Bjerknes to discuss the theory of the weather fronts and air masses. His observations provided him with data on the rate of conversion of energy between the atmosphere and the ocean, which will earn him international recognition.

== Sandström Theorem ==
Sandstrom was principally concerned with the role of heating and cooling in driving ocean currents, and in the larger-scale ocean circulation in general. He asserted that thermal circulation can cause vigorous, steady circulation only if heating occurs at greater depths than cooling. This is known today as Sandström's theorem and represents an attempt at extending the well known result of classical thermodynamic theory that in order for a heat engine to perform positive work over a cycle, the work of expansion needs to occur at greater pressure than the work of contraction.

Sandstrom's theorem is therefore technically true, as long as expansion in the fluid is caused by heating and contraction by cooling, and that greater depths occur at greater pressures. There is an ambiguity, however, as to the meaning of the terms 'heating' and 'cooling' in Sandstrom's theorem. So far, heating and cooling has always been interpreted in the literature as being associated with 'surface heating' and 'surface cooling' respectively.

In real fluids, however, molecular and turbulent diffusion always cause internal heating/cooling even in absence of external heating/cooling, as long as the temperature of the fluid considered is non-uniform. As is well-known, molecular and turbulent diffusion tends to relax the system toward thermodynamic equilibrium, i.e., toward an isothermal state, which for a statically stable fluid, will warm up the fluid at high pressure, and cool it down at low pressure. Therefore, because of internal diabatic heating/cooling by molecular/turbulent diffusion, the overall heating experienced by a stratified fluid always occurs at greater pressure than the total cooling, even if the external cooling/heating occur at the same pressure.

As a result, internal diabatic heating/cooling due to molecular diffusion explains why laboratory experiments show evidence of circulations developing as the result of surface heating/cooling (Park and Whitehead, 2000) or even when the heating is above the cooling (Coman et al., 2006). Sandström's key (though not clearly expressed) insight, was that in such circulations, the circulation as a whole must transport light water downwards and dense water upwards. This means that the effect of the circulation is to increase the potential energy. Such an increase requires an external source of energy. Recent work has built on this to argue that the ocean circulation as a whole is driven by these external sources of energy, whether wind or tides, with newer work suggesting that internal sources and sinks of energy (such as those driving diffusion) are also potentially important.

== Honors ==
In 1925, Sandström was elected a member of the Royal Swedish Academy of Sciences.

== Publications ==
- Sandstrom, J. W. (1908), Dynamische Versuche mit Meerwasser, Ann. Hydrog. Mar. Meteorol., 36, 6–23.

== See also ==
- Bergen School of Meteorology
