= Tyndall (lunar crater) =

Crater on the Moon

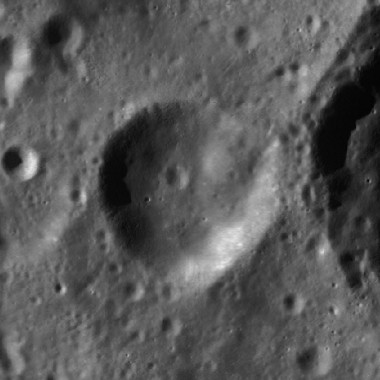
- LRO WAC image
- Coordinates: 34.9°S 117.0°E
- Diameter: 18 km
- Depth: Unknown
- Colongitude: 243° at sunrise
- Eponym: John Tyndall

Tyndall is a relatively small lunar impact crater on the far side of the Moon, behind the southeastern limb. It is located very near the western outer rim of the larger crater Pizzetti, and the two are separated only by a few kilometers. To the southwest of Tyndall is the crater Bjerknes, and to the south lies Clark.

This is a roughly circular, bowl-shaped crater with a slight outward bulge along the eastern face. The rim edge is not significantly eroded and remains well-defined. The inner wall has some patches of slightly higher albedo along the south and southwest faces. The remainder of the interior is relatively featureless, with only a few tiny craterlets to mark the surface.

== Satellite craters ==
By convention these features are identified on lunar maps by placing the letter on the side of the crater midpoint that is closest to Tyndall.

Tyndall	Latitude	Longitude	Diameter
S	35.1° S	115.7° E	18 km
