= Pizzetti =

Pizzetti may refer to:

== People ==
- Angelo Pizzetti (born 1963), Italian football player
- Ildebrando Pizzetti (1880–1968), Italian composer
- Paolo Pizzetti (1860–1918), Italian geodesist, astronomer, geophysicist and mathematician
- Samuel Pizzetti (born 1986), Italian swimmer

== Other ==
- Pizzetti (crater), a Moon crater named after Paolo Pizzetti
