= James Pollard Espy =

American meteorologist

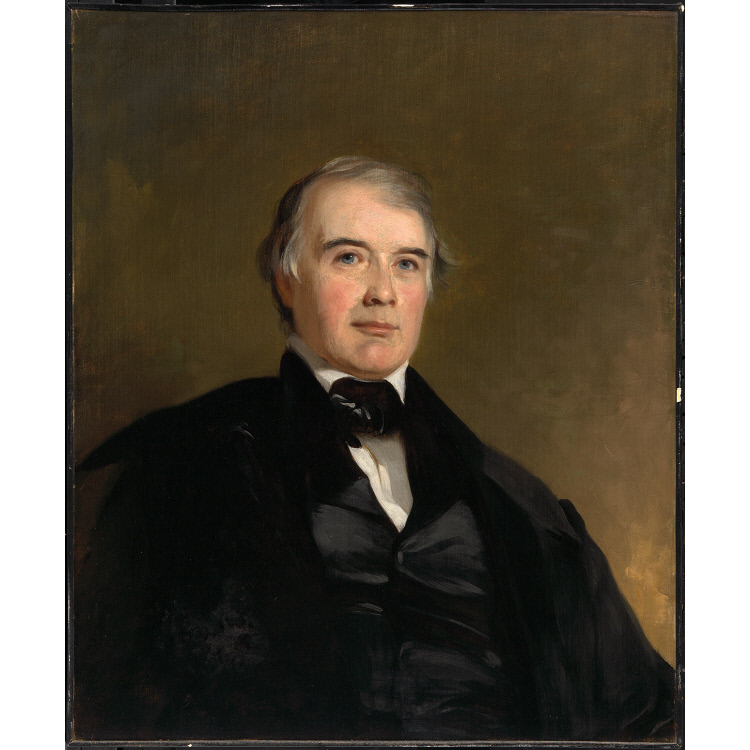
- portrait by Thomas Sully
- Born: May 9, 1785; Westmorland County, PA.
- Died: January 24, 1860 (aged 74); Cincinnati, OH
- Awards: Magellanic Premium (1836)
- Scientific career
- Fields: Meteorology

Signature
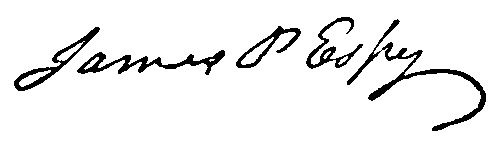

James Pollard Espy (or the Storm King) (May 9, 1785 – January 24, 1860) was a U.S. meteorologist. Espy developed a convection theory of storms, explaining it in 1836 before the American Philosophical Society and in 1840 before the French Académie des Sciences and the British Royal Society. His theory was published in 1840 as The Philosophy of Storms. He became meteorologist to the War (1842) and Navy (1848) departments and developed the use of the telegraph in assembling weather observation data by which he studied the progress of storms and laid the basis for scientific weather forecasting.

== Life and career ==
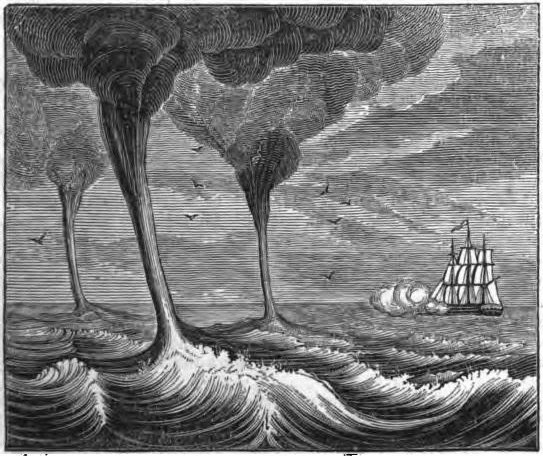
Illustration from the book The Philosophy of Storms. For an account of the manner in which one spout, while forming, tends to generate others in its neighborhood. - James Pollard Espy 1841

Espy had an ardent desire for knowledge and commenced teaching school as a means to obtaining a classical education at Transylvania University, Lexington, Kentucky. After leaving the University in 1808 he taught an academy at Cumberland, Maryland. He studied law and practiced that profession four years at Xenia, Ohio. In 1812 he married Miss Margaret Pollard and took her last name as his middle name. In 1817 he became a teacher of classics in Philadelphia where he lived for 20 years. He soon, however, had his attention drawn to natural science and about 1828 he began his studies and investigations into the cause of storms which made him, at that time, the foremost American meteorologist. In 1833 he wrote a summary of his theory of the upward movement of the air in storms (convection) and of their self-sustaining power from the evolution of latent heat.

In 1834 Espy became meteorologist for both the Franklin Institute and the American Philosophical Society (APS) of Philadelphia. As chair of a joint committee, he established a network of weather observers to study storms. He convinced the Pennsylvania legislature to appropriate $4,000 to equip an observer in each county with barometer, thermometers, and rain gage. One result is the first appearance of meteorology in the records of Congress. For this work, he was elected a member of the APS in 1835.

In 1836 he abandoned the profession of teaching and began lecturing before scientific bodies and popular audiences. These lectures caused him to be popularly known as the Storm King. In 1840 he visited Europe and presented his theory of storms before the British Science Association and the French Academy of Sciences. It was during the discussion that followed the presentation of his theory before the French Academy that the French physicist and astronomer, Francois Arago said: “France has its Cuvier, England its Newton, America its Espy.”

In 1841 his The Philosophy of Storms was published in Boston. In this book Espy proposed to burn Appalachian forests to make it rain, is perhaps the earliest idea for climate engineering.

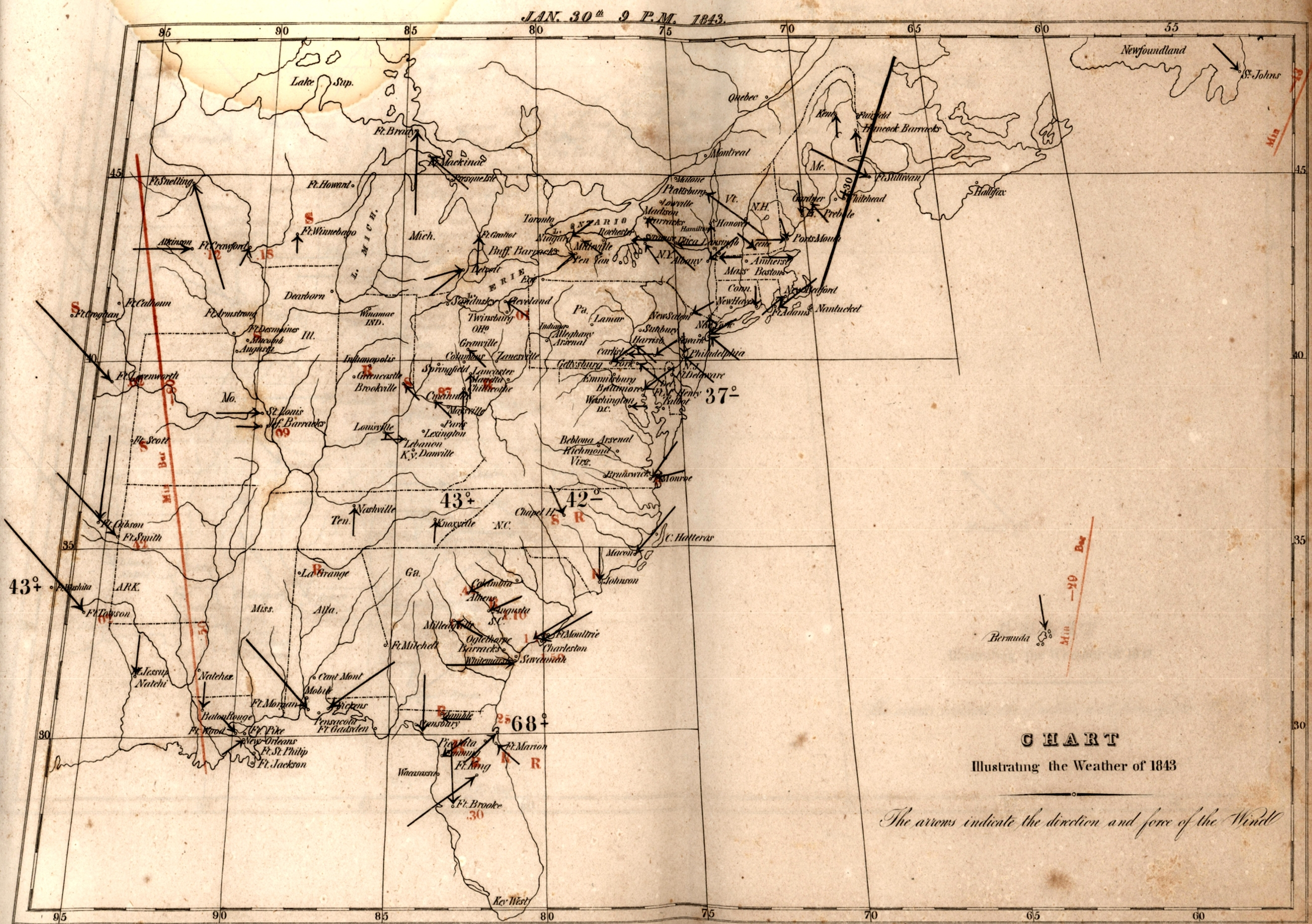
Weather map by Espy, 1843

In 1843 he was appointed the first meteorologist of the U.S. Government and was assigned to duty, first under the Surgeon General of the Army, next under the Secretary of the Navy and finally in 1848 under the Secretary of the Smithsonian Institution.

His work in Washington, D. C. was concluded in 1859 and he then spent some time in visiting his relatives and friends in Ohio and Pennsylvania. While on a visit to Cincinnati, Ohio, Professor Espy was stricken with paralysis January 17, 1860 and died at the residence of his nephew, John Westcott, January 24. He was buried in the cemetery at Harrisburg, Pennsylvania, by the side of his wife who had passed on ten years earlier.

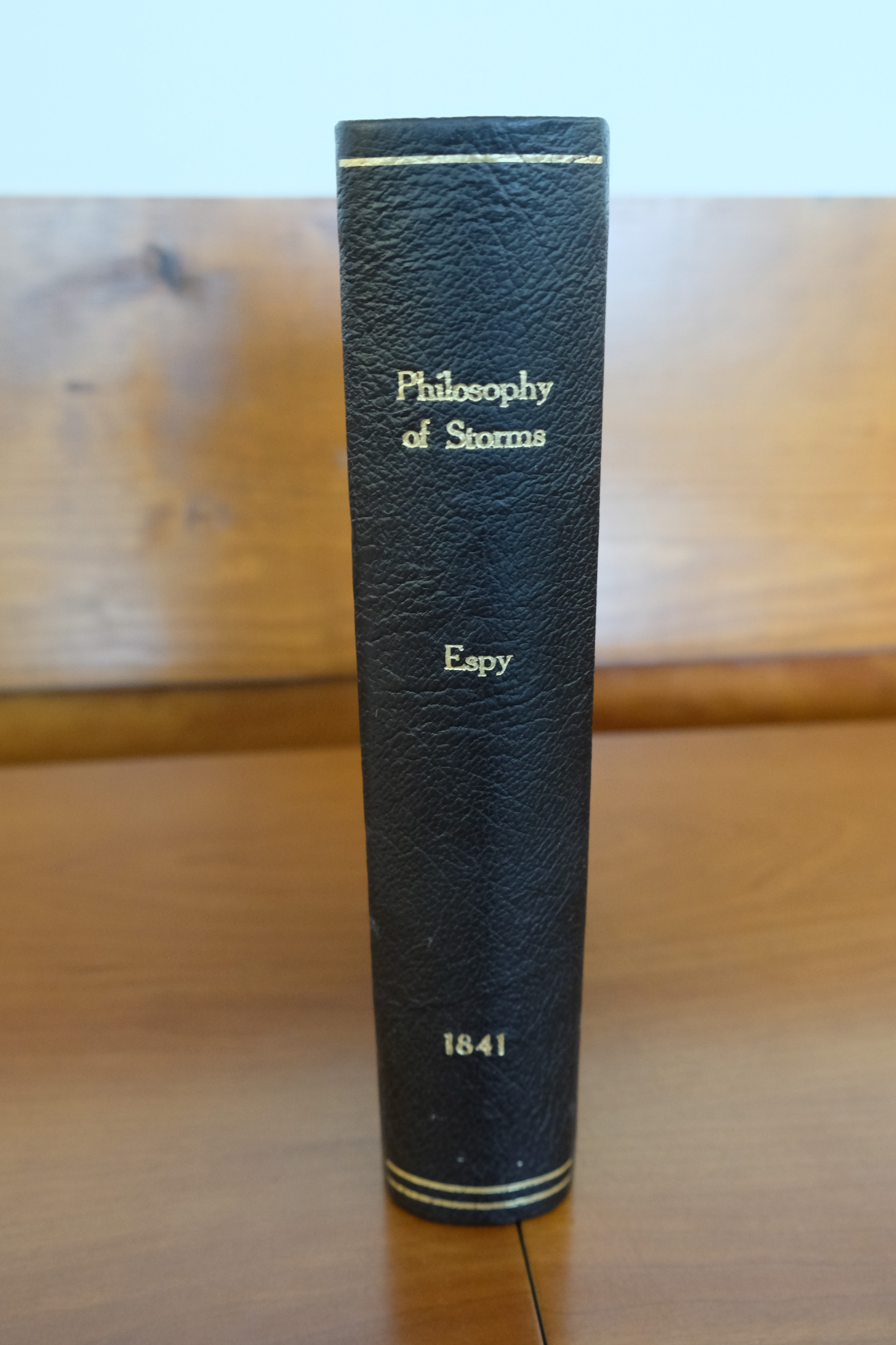
1841 copy of Espy's "The Philosophy of Storms"

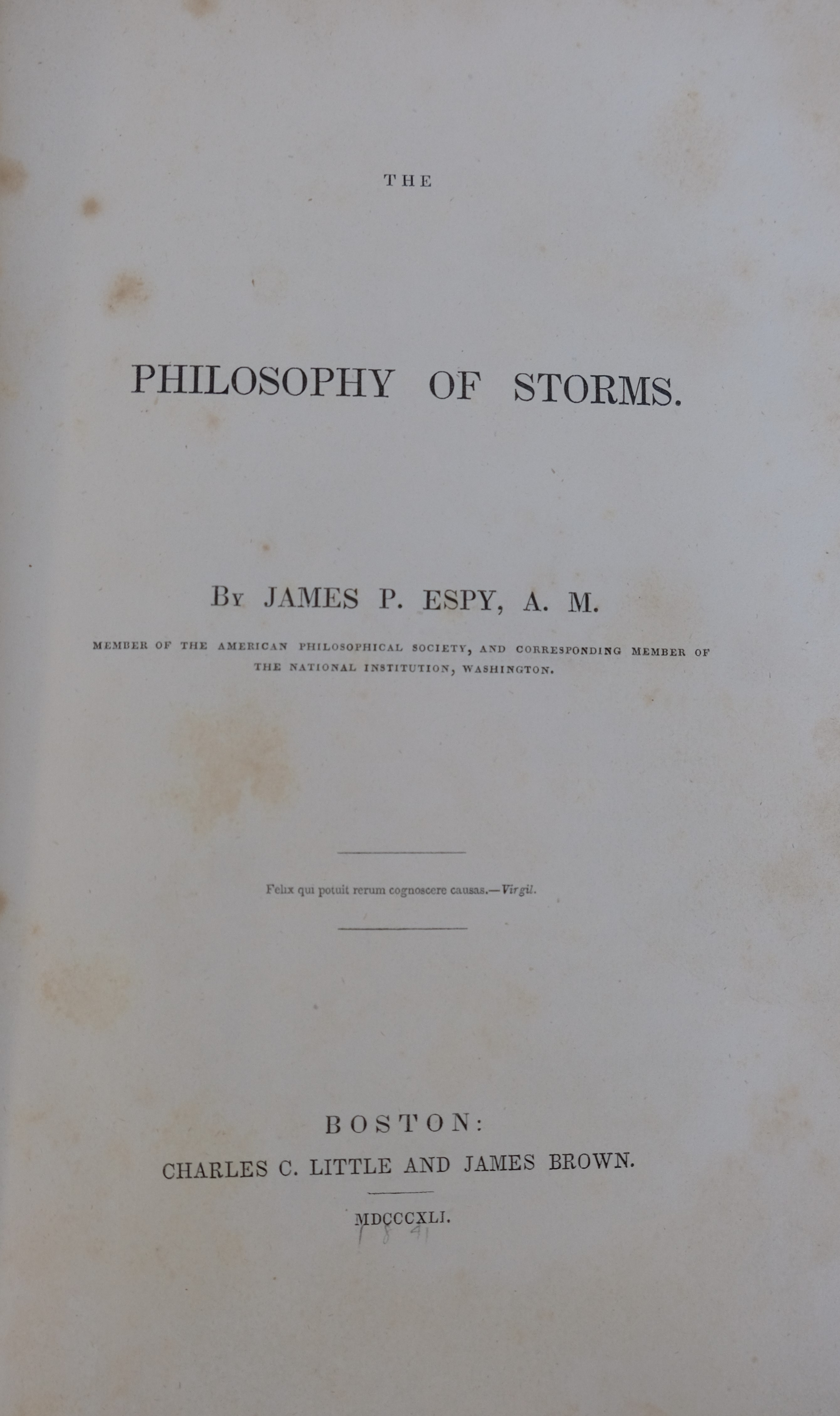
Title page of "The Philosophy of Storms"

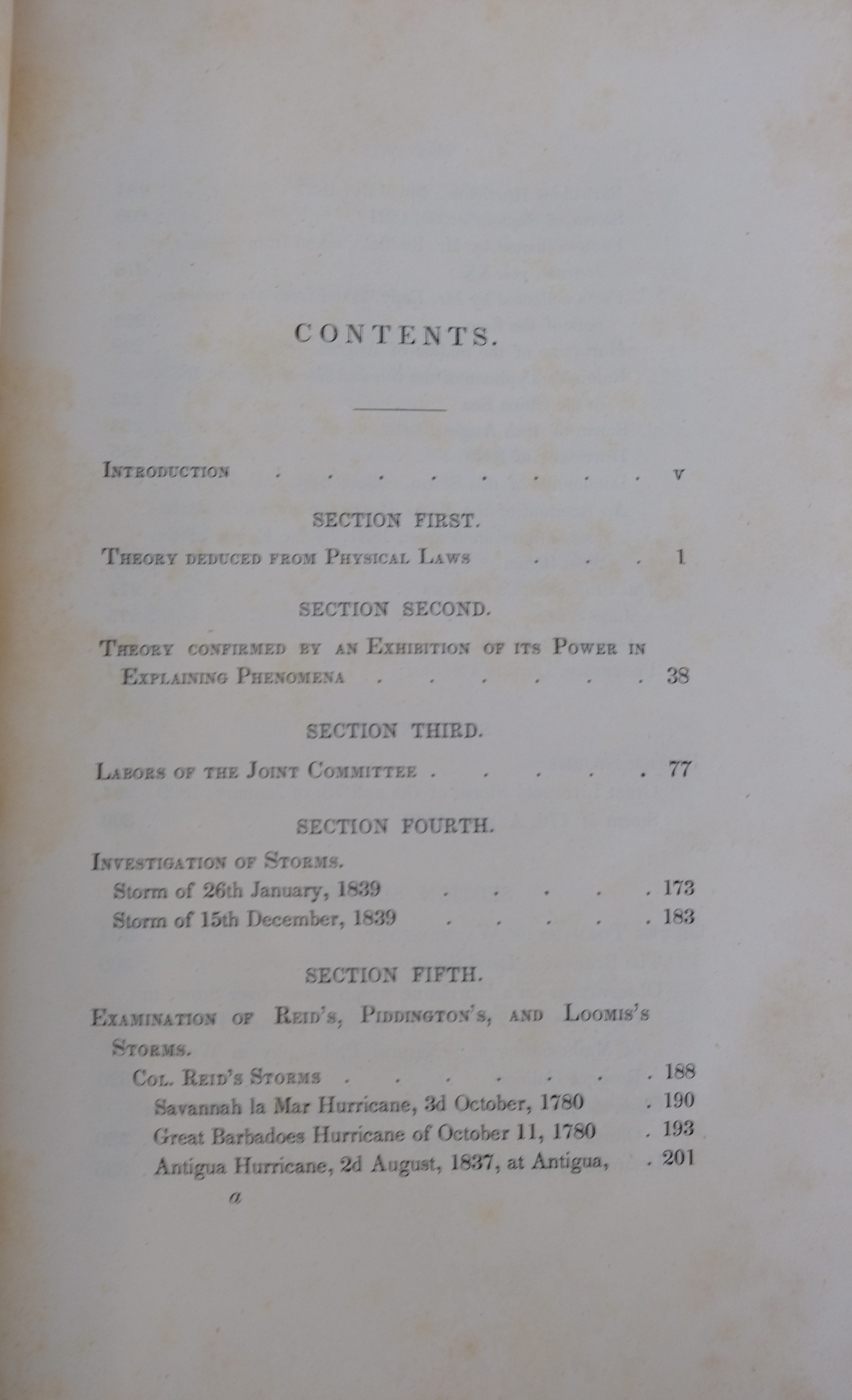
Table of contents for "The Philosophy of Storms"

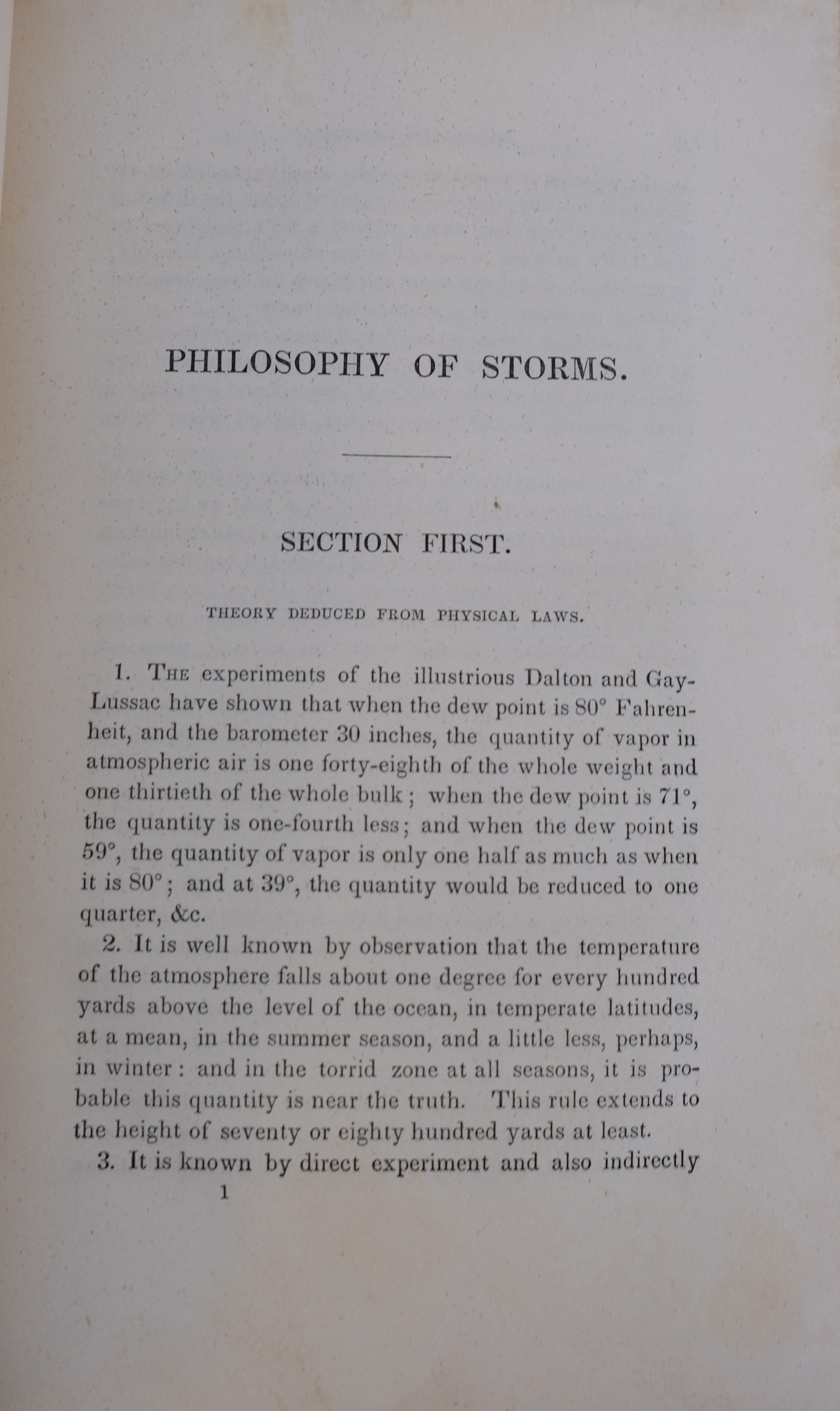
First page of "The Philosophy of Storms"

== See also ==
- History of surface weather analysis
- William Charles Redfield
- Espy's formula for Lifted condensation level (cloud base)
