= Ice season in the Baltic Sea =

The Baltic Sea ice season starts when the first ice has formed and ends when the last ice has melted, usually the first ice forms around November and the last remains melt in April or May. But the timeframe can vary from year to year depending on the weather conditions. The table below lists the ice statistics of each year since 1991, including: when the first ice formed, the maximum ice extent, the date of reaching the maximum ice extent and additionally the length of the ice season. The list is based on the Finnish Meteorological Institute's data, which is made in collaboration with SMHI.

== Yearly statistics of Sea Ice seasons 1991-2025 ==
| Year | First ice formation | Length of the season | Maximum ice extent (km^{2}) | Date of maximum extent |
|---|---|---|---|---|
| 1990/1991 | - | - | 126 000 | - |
| 1991/1992 | - | - | 74 000 | - |
| 1992/1993 | - | - | 98 000 | - |
| 1993/1994 | - | - | 221 000 | - |
| 1994/1995 | - | - | 76 000 | - |
| 1995/1996 | - | - | 265 000 | - |
| 1996/1997 | mid November | Longer than usual | 265 000 | February 18 |
| 1997/1998 | late October | about normal | 130 000 | March 18 |
| 1998/1999 | early November | about normal | 157 000 | February 11 |
| 1999/2000 | late November | a little bit shorter than usual | 95 000 | February 24 |
| 2000/2001 | late November | shorter than usual | 129 000 | March 26 |
| 2001/2002 | early November | a little bit shorter than usual | 102 000 | February 1 |
| 2002/2003 | late October | longer than usual | 233 000 | March 5 |
| 2003/2004 | late November | about normal | 153 000 | March 11 |
| 2004/2005 | mid November | shorter than usual | 178 000 | March 16 |
| 2005/2006 | early December | about normal | 211 000 | March 16 |
| 2006/2007 | early November | shorter than usual | 140 000 | February 23 |
| 2007/2008 | mid November | much shorter than usual | 49 000 | March 24 |
| 2008/2009 | mid to late November | shorter than usual | 110 000 | February 20 |
| 2009/2010 | early November | about normal to slightly longer | 244 000 | February 17 |
| 2010/2011 | mid November | longer than usual | 309 000 | February 25 |
| 2011/2012 | early December | much shorter than usual | 179 000 | February 11 |
| 2012/2013 | late November | about normal | 177 000 | March 15 |
| 2013/2014 | late November | shorter than usual | 100 000 | February 7 |
| 2014/2015 | mid November | shorter than usual | 51 000 | January 23 |
| 2015/2016 | late November | shorter than usual | 110 000 | January 22 |
| 2016/2017 | late November | about normal | 101 000 | February 12 |
| 2017/2018 | early November | about normal | 175 000 | March 5 |
| 2018/2019 | early December | shorter than usual | 88 000 | January 27 |
| 2019/2020 | early December | much shorter than usual | 37 000 | March 5 |
| 2020/2021 | mid November | shorter than usual | 127 000 | February 15 |
| 2021/2022 | late October | longer than usual | 93 000 | February 4 |
| 2022/2023 | early December | a little bit shorter | 81 000 | March 12 |
| 2023/2024 | late October | longer than usual | 135 000 | February 12 |
| 2024/2025 | early November | shorter than usual | 85 000 | February 20 |
| 2025/2026 | early November | longer than usual | 181 000 | February 20 |
