= Jacob Bjerknes =

Norwegian-American meteorologist (1897–1975)

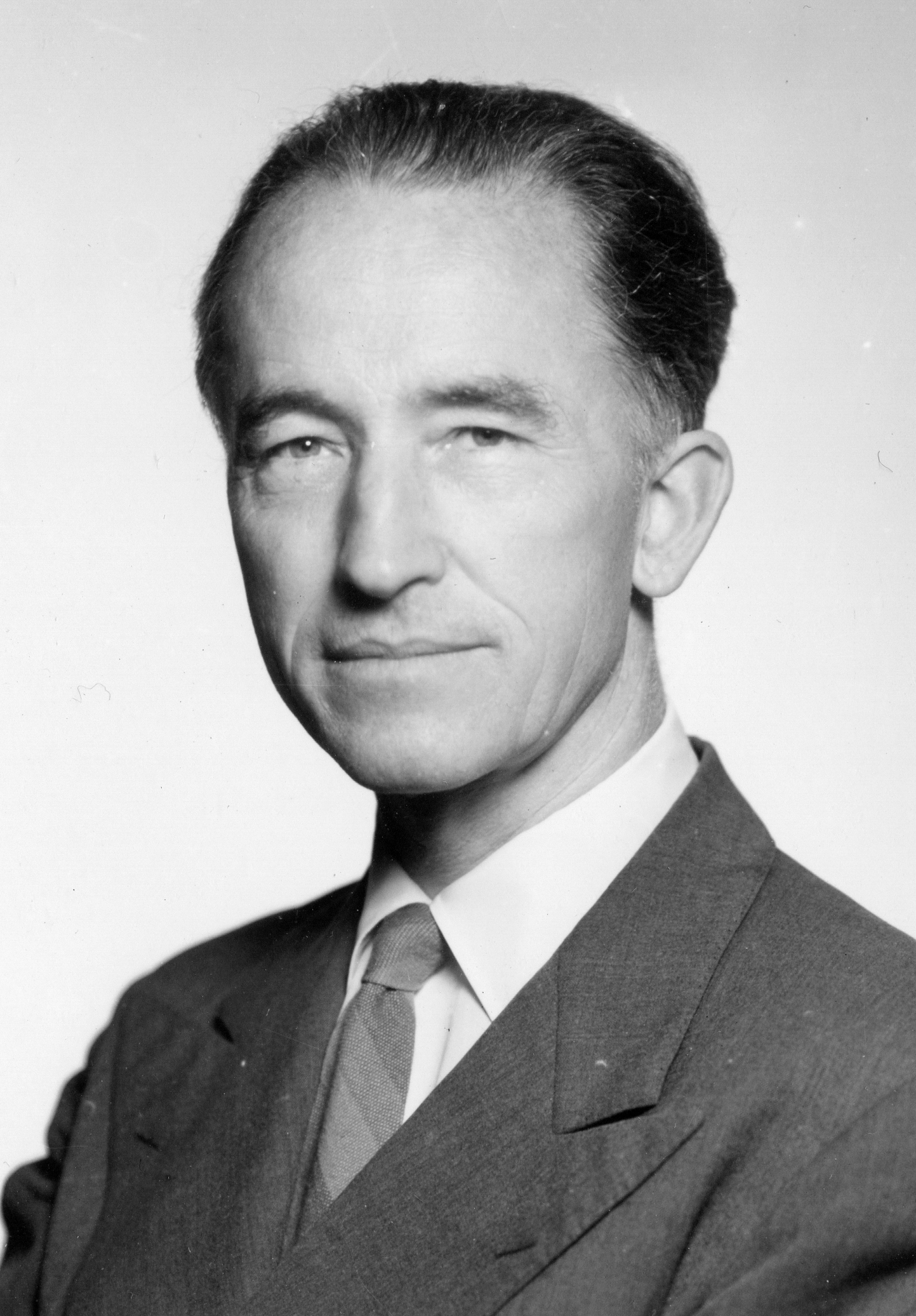
- Bjerknes in 1968
- Born: 2 November 1897; Stockholm, Sweden
- Died: 7 July 1975 (aged 77); Los Angeles, United States
- Citizenship: Norwegian; American
- Known for: ENSO; Norwegian cyclone model Weather forecasting
- Awards: National Medal of Science (1966); Carl-Gustaf Rossby Research Medal (1960); International Meteorological Organization Prize (1959); Guggenheim Fellowship (1957); William Bowie Medal (1945); Symons Gold Medal (1940); Vega Medal (1939)
- Scientific career
- Fields: Meteorologist
- Workplaces: University of California, Los Angeles

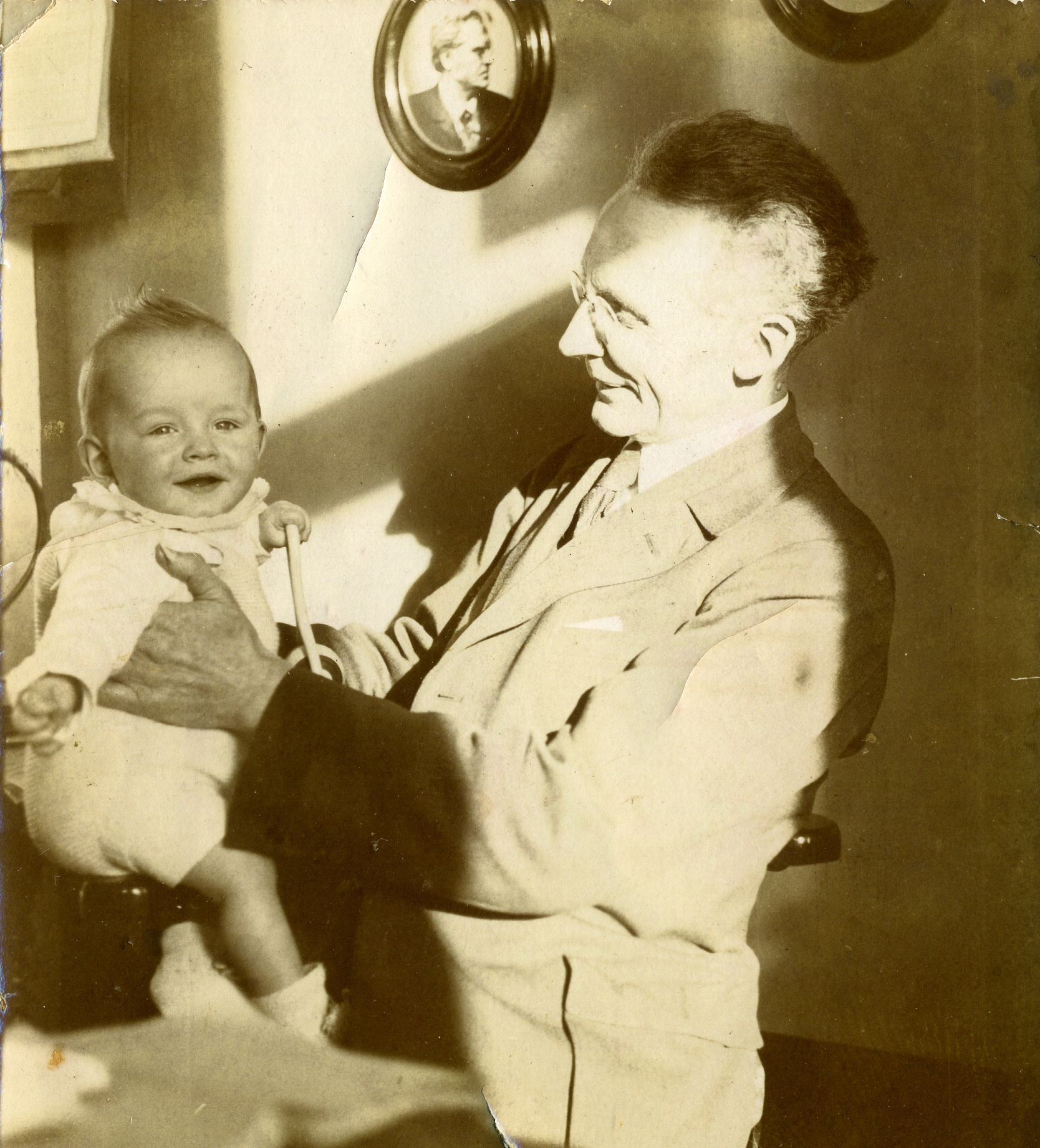
Jacob Bjerknes with his father Vilhelm Bjerknes, 1897

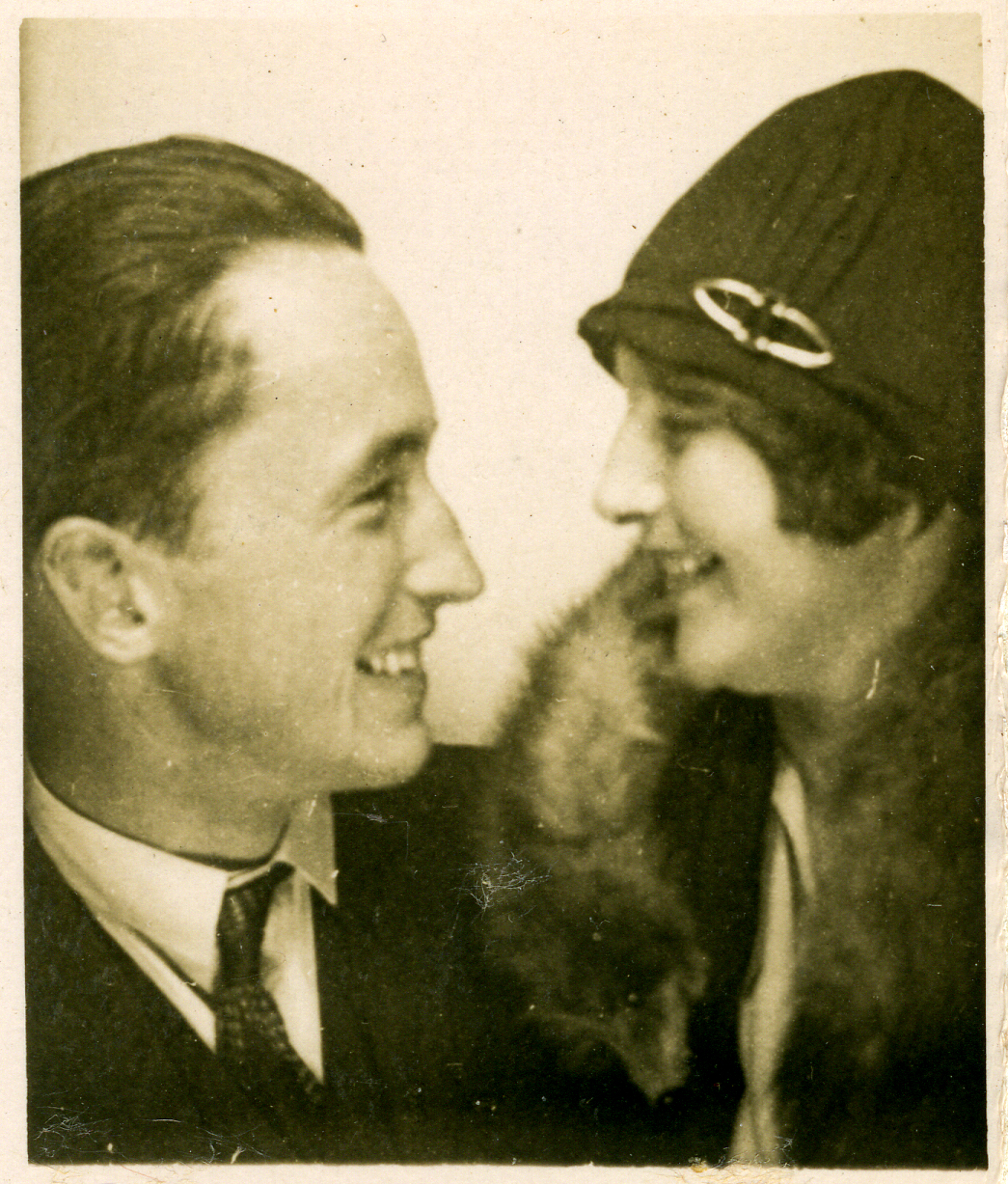
Jacob and his wife Hedvig Bjerknes, née Borthen, Tivoli, Denmark, 1929

Jacob Aall Bonnevie Bjerknes (/ˈjɑːkəb ˈbjɜːrknɪs/ YAH-kəb BYURK-niss, Norwegian: [ˈjɑ̀ːkɔb ˈbjæ̂rkneːs]; 2 November 1897 – 7 July 1975) was a Swedish-born Norwegian-American meteorologist. He is known for his key paper in which he pointed the dynamics of the polar front, mechanism for north–south heat transport and for which he was also awarded a doctorate from the University of Oslo.

Born in Stockholm, Sweden, he was the son of the Norwegian meteorologist Vilhelm Bjerknes, one of the pioneers of modern weather forecasting. He helped develop the Norwegian cyclone model. He earned a Ph.D. from the University of Oslo in 1924. Bjerknes supported the team that made the first crossing of the Arctic in the airship Norge. During WWII, he helped the US with the planning of the Hiroshima and Nagasaki atomic bombings. He also helped gain an understanding of the weather phenomenon El Niño.

== Background ==
Jacob Aall Bonnevie Bjerknes was born in Stockholm, Sweden. His father was the Norwegian meteorologist Vilhelm Bjerknes, one of the pioneers of modern weather forecasting. His paternal grandfather was Norwegian mathematician and physicist Carl Anton Bjerknes. His maternal grandfather was Norwegian politician Jacob Aall Bonnevie, after whom he was named.

== Professional career ==
Bjerknes was part of a group of meteorologists led by his father, Vilhelm Bjerknes, at the University of Leipzig. Together they developed the model that explains the generation, intensification and ultimate decay (the life cycle) of mid-latitude cyclones, introducing the idea of fronts, that is, sharply defined boundaries between air masses. This concept is known as the Norwegian cyclone model.

Bjerknes returned to Norway in 1917, where his father founded the Geophysical Institute, University of Bergen in Bergen. They organized an analysis and forecasting branch which would evolve into a weather bureau by 1919. The scientific team at Bergen also included the Swedish meteorologists Carl-Gustaf Rossby and Tor Bergeron. As pointed out in a key paper by Jacob Bjerknes and Halvor Solberg (1895–1974) in 1922, the dynamics of the polar front, integrated with the cyclone model, provided the major mechanism for north–south heat transport in the atmosphere. For this and other research, Jacob Bjerknes was awarded a Ph.D. from the University of Oslo in 1924.

In 1926, Jacob Bjerknes was a support meteorologist when Roald Amundsen made the first crossing of the Arctic in the airship Norge, as well as for the previous year's attempts with the aircraft n24/N25 about which he authored a chapter on "The weather" in the account that Amundsen published. In 1931, he left his position as head of the National weather service at Bergen to become professor of meteorology at the Geophysical Institute at the University of Bergen. Jacob Bjerknes lectured at the Massachusetts Institute of Technology during the 1933–1934 school year.

In 1940, he emigrated to the United States, where he headed a government-sponsored meteorology annex for weather forecasting, at the department of physics of the University of California, Los Angeles. During the Second World War Bjerknes was in the US armed forces, and serving as a colonel in the US Air Force he helped determine the best dates for the atomic bombings of Hiroshima and Nagasaki.

Bjerknes founded the UCLA Department of Meteorology (now the Department of Atmospheric and Oceanic Sciences). As a professor at the University of California, he was the first to see a connection between unusually warm sea-surface temperatures and the weak easterlies and heavy rainfall that accompany low-index conditions. At UCLA, Bjerknes and fellow Norwegian-American meteorologist, Jorgen Holmboe, further developed the pressure tendency and the extratropical cyclone theories.

In 1969, Jacob Bjerknes helped toward an understanding of the El Niño-Southern Oscillation, by suggesting that the increased sea-surface temperatures observed in the central and eastern Pacific during El Niños, were due to a reduction in the trade winds of the Southern Hemisphere and the consequent weakening of equatorial upwelling. He also proposed an overturning of the atmosphere, the Walker Circulation, which is most developed during La Niñas when the trade winds are strongest and the temperature gradient along the Equator is greatest.

== Personal life ==
In 1928, he married Hedvig Borthen (1904–1998). They were the parents of two children. He died on 7 July 1975 in Los Angeles, California.

== Honors and awards ==
He was made an Honorary Member of the Royal Meteorological Society in 1932 and a member of both the Norwegian Academy of Science and Letters and the Royal Swedish Academy of Science in 1933.

- Royal Meteorological Society - Symons Gold Medal (1940)
- American Geophysical Union - William Bowie Medal (1945)
- Knight 1st Class of the Royal Norwegian Order of St. Olav (1947).
- Swedish Society for Anthropology and Geography - Vega medal (1958)
- World Meteorological Organization - International Meteorological Organization Prize (1959).
- American Meteorological Society - Carl-Gustaf Rossby Research Medal (1960)
- National Medal of Science (1966)
- American Academy of Achievement - Golden Plate Award (1967)
