= Halvor Solberg =

Norwegian meteorologist

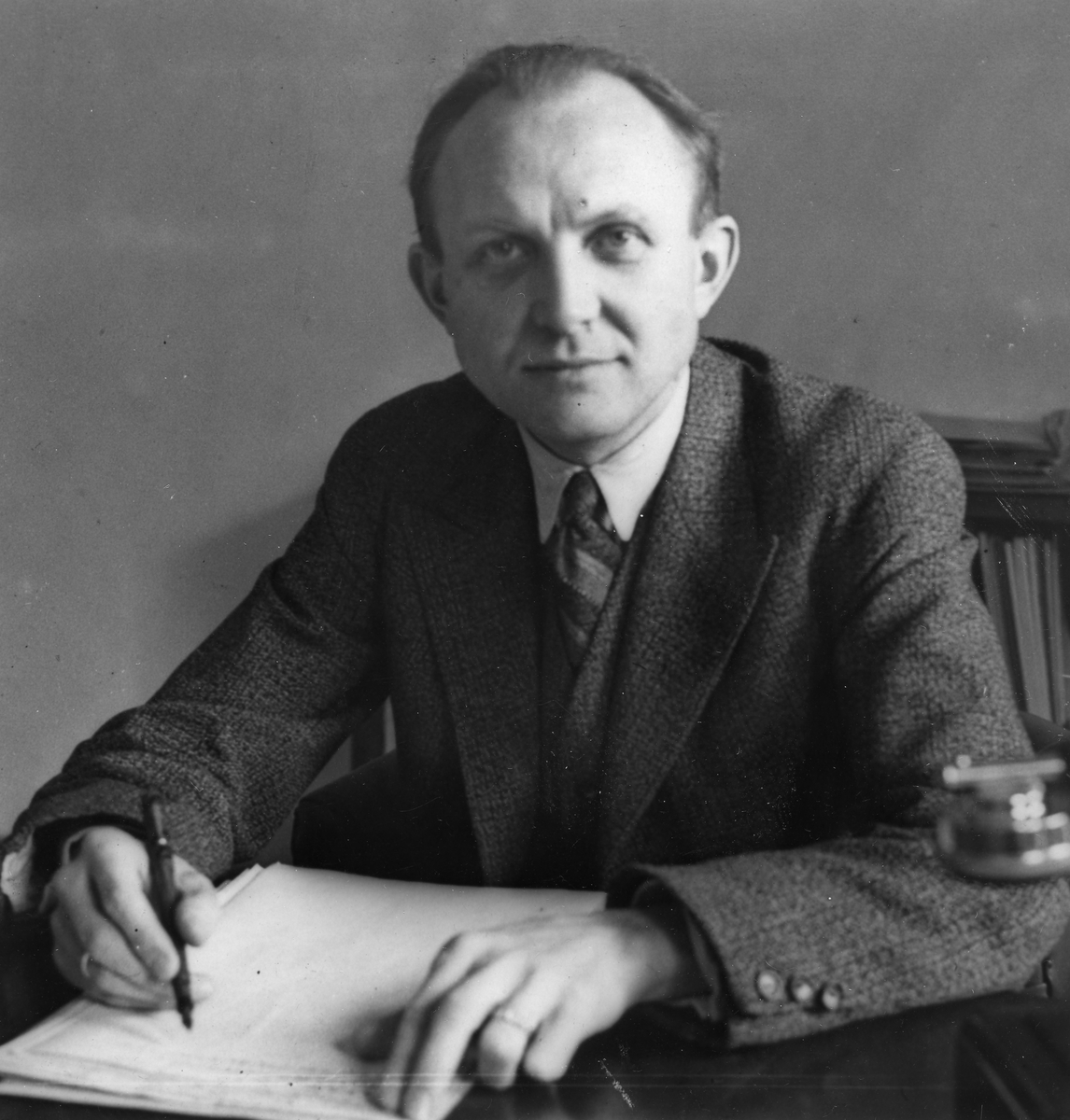
Halvor Solberg

Halvor Solberg (5 February 1895 – 31 January 1974) was a Norwegian meteorologist.

He was born in Ringsaker Municipality. He was a central member of the Bergen School of Meteorology, working as meteorologist in Kristiania from 1918. His thesis Integrationen der atmosphärischen Störungsgleichungen was published in 1928. He was appointed professor at the University of Oslo from 1930 to 1964. In the 1930s he worked on the theory of tides, atmospheric waves and oscillations, and stability of gas and liquid flow.

He was a fellow of the Norwegian Academy of Science and Letters from 1930, and served as secretary-general from 1946 to 1954. He chaired the Norwegian Geophysical Society from 1937 to 1938.
