= Bergen school (meteorology) =

School of thought in meteorology

The Bergen school of meteorology is a school of thought which is the basis for much of modern weather forecasting.

Founded by the meteorologist Prof. Vilhelm Bjerknes and his younger colleagues in 1917, the Bergen School attempts to define the motion of the atmosphere by means of the mathematics of interactions between hydro- and thermodynamics, some of which had originally been discovered or explained by Bjerknes himself, thus making mathematical predictions regarding the weather possible by systematic data analysis. Much of the work was done at the Geophysical Institute, University of Bergen, in Bergen, Norway.

The Bergen school was crucial in the early development and operationalization of numerical weather forecasting in the 1940s and 1950s, which was largely a cooperation between Scandinavian and US researchers. In this development, extant meteorological theories were synthesized. Due to the vast amount of calculations necessary for producing viable forecasts, the mathematical models were adapted to computer programs. The cross-Atlantic cooperations was also important to the development of the Bergen School and the Norwegian meteorology community.

== Bjerknes' assistants during the period 1917–1926 ==
- Jacob Bjerknes
- Halvor Solberg
- Tor Bergeron
- Carl-Gustaf Rossby
- Sverre Petterssen
- Erik Palmén
- Erik Björkdal
- Svein Rosseland
- Carl Ludvig Godske
- Johan Sandström

== See also ==
- Norwegian cyclone model
- Cyclogenesis
- Surface weather analysis
- Synoptic scale meteorology
