= Carl Ludvig Godske =

Norwegian mathematician and meteorologist

Carl Ludvig Schreiner Godske (20 May 1906 – 3 July 1970) was a Norwegian mathematician and meteorologist. He was born in Bindal Municipality. He was a member of the Bergen School of Meteorology, working as meteorologist in Bergen from 1938, and appointed professor at the University of Bergen from 1946. Among his publications is Dynamic Meteorology and Weather Forecasting from 1957. He was also a pioneer in the application of electronic computers in Norway. He chaired the Norwegian Geophysical Society from 1956 to 1957 and was a fellow of the Norwegian Academy of Science and Letters from 1937. He was decorated Knight, First Class of the Order of St. Olav in 1967.
