= Bjerknes (lunar crater) =

Crater on the Moon

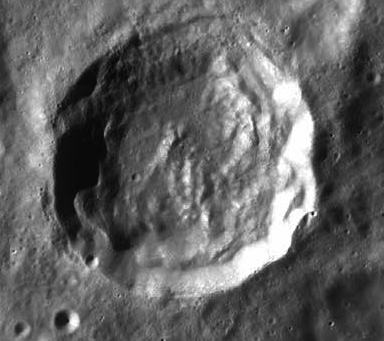
- LRO WAC image
- Coordinates: 38.4°S 113.0°E
- Diameter: 48.18 km (29.94 mi)
- Depth: Unknown
- Colongitude: 247° at sunrise
- Formation: Late Imbrian
- Eponym: Vilhelm F. K. Bjerknes

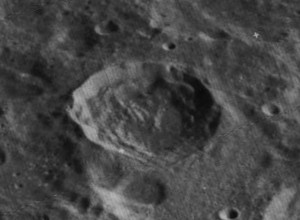
Oblique view from Lunar Orbiter 3, facing south

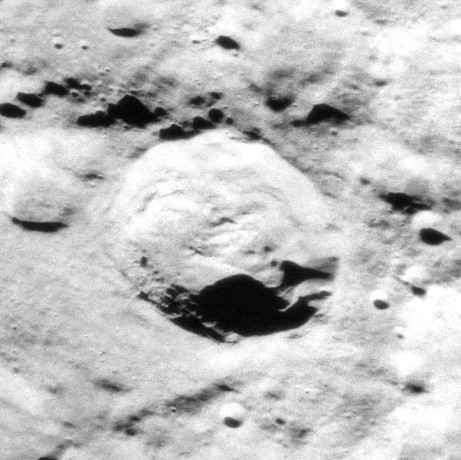
Oblique view from Apollo 17, facing east

Bjerknes (/ˈbjɜːrknɪs/) is a lunar impact crater that is located in the southern hemisphere on the rugged far side of the Moon. The crater lies behind the southeastern limb, and beyond the region that is sometimes brought into sight through libration. Thus this crater can not be viewed from Earth, and has only been seen from orbit. Nearby named craters are Clark to the east, Pizzetti in the north, and Pogson to the south-southwest.

This formation dates to the Late Imbrian period of the lunar geologic timescale. The crater rim is generally circular, but with some slight irregularities along the northeastern quadrant. The rim is relatively sharp-edged, and displays little appearance of wear. The interior floor is rough and irregular, beginning with the slumped material at the base of the inner walls.

The crater is named in honor of Norwegian physicist Vilhelm Bjerknes (1862–1951), a pioneer in the field of weather forecasting. Its designation was formally adopted by the International Astronomical Union in 1970.

== Satellite craters ==
By convention these features are identified on lunar maps by placing the letter on the side of the crater midpoint that is closest to Bjerknes.

Bjerknes	Latitude	Longitude	Diameter
A	36.0° S	113.7° E	18 km
B	37.2° S	113.8° E	20 km
E	38.0° S	115.0° E	54 km
