= Jørgen Holmboe =

Norwegian-American meteorologist (1902–1979)

- Born: November 8, 1902; Hammerfest, Norway
- Died: October 29, 1979 (aged 76)
- Scientific career
- Fields: Meteorology
- Doctoral advisor: Vilhelm Bjerknes
- Doctoral students: Jule Gregory Charney

Jørgen Holmboe (November 8, 1902 – October 29, 1979) was a Norwegian-American meteorologist.

== Life and career ==
Jørgen Holmboe was born near Hammerfest, Norway, on an island a short distance from the northernmost point in Norway. He was the son of priest Leonhard Christian Borchgrevink Holmboe, Jr. and his wife Thea Louise Schetelig. He had several brothers and sisters. His great-grandfather Leonhard Christian Borchgrevink Holmboe was a priest and national politician.

He received his early education from his father, who was a minister, attended secondary school in Tromsø, and took his university entrance examinations in Bodø. He entered the University of Oslo in 1922. In 1925, he was appointed research assistant to Professor Vilhelm Bjerknes, who had moved from Bergen where as founding director of the Geophysical Institute he had led development of the Bergen School of Meteorology. In 1930, he passed his Candidate Real examinations and took a position as meteorologist in the Norwegian Weather Service in Tromsø. In 1932, he was transferred to Bergen, and, from 1933 to 1935, he served as meteorologist with the Lincoln Ellsworth Antarctic Expedition.

In 1936, he was invited to the Massachusetts Institute of Technology, where he served as assistant professor. In 1940, he was asked to join in establishing a meteorology program at University of California, Los Angeles. The program was initially part of the physics department; it became a separate department in 1946. Holmboe was chairman for the first year after the Department of Meteorology was established and served as chairman again for the period from 1949 through 1958. In 1944, Holmboe became a naturalized American citizen. Holmboe was elected fellow of the American Meteorological Society and the American Geophysical Union and foreign member of the Norwegian Academy of Science and Letters.

== Selected works ==
- On the Theory of Cyclones (paper jointly with J. Bjerknes. 1944)
- Dynamic Meteorology (New York: John Wiley and Sons, Inc. 1952)
- On the instability of stratified shear flow (Universitetsforlaget. 1966)
- Instability of baroclinic three-layer models of the atmosphere (Universitetsforlaget. 1968)

== Sources ==
- A Biography of Jorgen Holmboe, 1902-1979 (by Jason Zarate)
