= Norwegian cyclone model =

Meteorological model describing the development of cyclones

The older of the models of extratropical cyclone development is known as the Norwegian cyclone model, developed during and shortly after World War I within the Bergen School of Meteorology. In this theory, cyclones develop as they move up and along a frontal boundary, eventually occluding and reaching a barotropically cold environment. It was developed completely from surface-based weather observations, including descriptions of clouds found near frontal boundaries. Developed from this model was the concept of the warm conveyor belt, which transports warm and moist air just ahead of the cold front above the surface warm front.

== Development of the theory ==
Polar front theory is attributed to Jacob Bjerknes, derived from a coastal network of observation sites in Norway during World War I. This theory proposed that the main inflow into a cyclone was concentrated along two lines of convergence, one ahead of the low and another trailing behind the low. The convergence line ahead of the low became known as either the steering line or the warm front. The trailing convergence zone was referred to as the squall line or cold front. Areas of clouds and rainfall appeared to be focused along these convergence zones. The concept of frontal zones led to the concept of air masses. The nature of the three-dimensional structure of the cyclone would wait for the development of the upper air network during the 1940s.

== Evolution ==
Stages of development

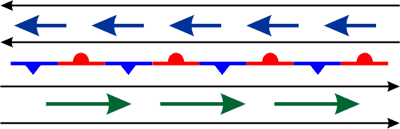
Initial stage

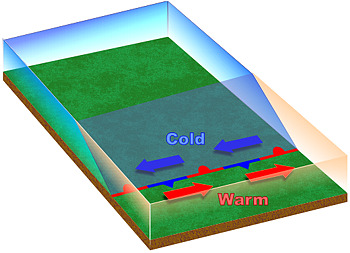

Wave forms on front

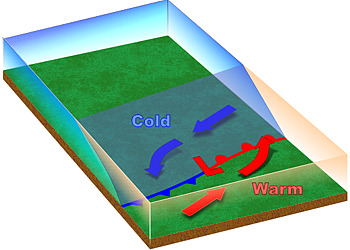

Wave intensifies

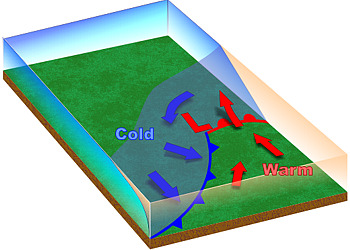

A mature low pressure system

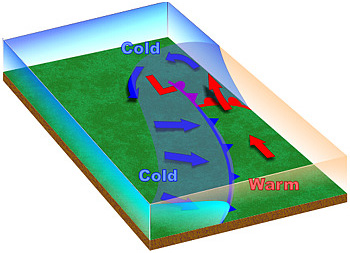

Dissipating stage of cyclone

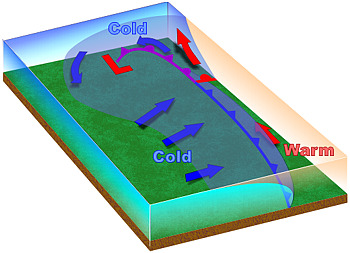

A wave along a frontal boundary, in the form of a broad area of low pressure, develops as an upper level disturbance moves towards that portion of the boundary. Precipitation will begin to form ahead of the surface low, within the cold sector of the cyclone poleward of the warm front. As the low deepens, both the cold and warm fronts around the low become better defined. As the low matures, it couples with the upper level disturbance moving into the cyclone's cold sector. The cold front catches up to the westward portion of the warm front, forming an occluded front. Eventually, the cyclone stacks with the upper level disturbance, becoming isolated within the cold sector, and begins to weaken as it becomes far removed from the original temperature discontinuity along the cold and warm fronts. At this point, it becomes a cold-core low. The frontal boundary becomes weaker and surrounds the equatorward portion of the cyclone, waiting for the next upper level disturbance to form a new low pressure area.

== Conveyor belt ==
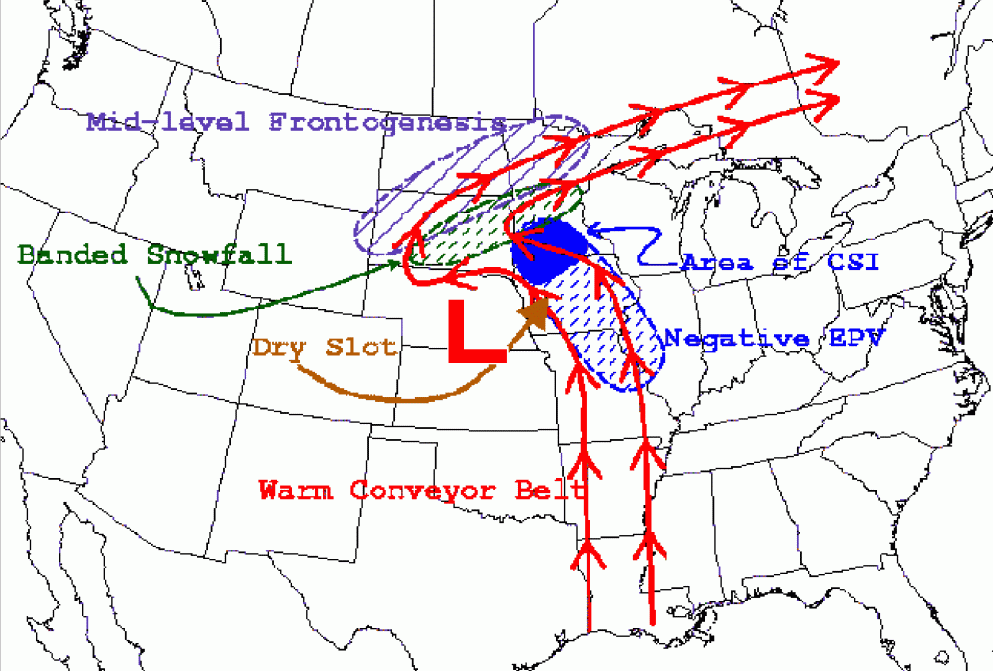
A depiction of warm conveyor belt precipitation during a wintertime extratropical cyclone

A conveyor belt, also referred to as the warm conveyor belt, describes the flow of a stream of warm moist air originating within the warm sector of an extratropical cyclone ahead of the cold front which slopes up above and north of the surface warm front. The idea of the conveyor belt originated in 1969. The left edge of the conveyor belt is sharp due to the higher density air moving in from the west forcing a sharp slope to the cold front. An area of stratiform precipitation develops north of the warm front along the conveyor belt. Active precipitation north of the warm front implies potential for greater development of the cyclone. A portion of this conveyor belt turns to the right (left in the Southern Hemisphere), aligning with the upper level westerly flow. However, the western portion of this belt wraps around the northwest (southwest in the Southern Hemisphere) side of the cyclone, which can contain moderate to heavy precipitation. If the air mass is cold enough, the precipitation falls in the form of heavy snow. Theory from the 1980s talked about the presence of a cold conveyor belt which originates north of the warm front and flows along a clockwise path (in the northern hemisphere) into the main belt of the westerlies aloft, but there has been conflicting evidence as to whether or not it actually exists.

== See also ==
- Surface weather analysis
