= Paolo Pizzetti =

Italian scientist (1860–1918)

Paolo Pizzetti (24 July 1860 – 14 April 1918) was an Italian geodesist, astronomer, geophysicist and mathematician. He studied engineering in Rome, graduating in 1880. He remained in Rome and assisted Giuseppe Pisati and Enrico Pucci with their absolute determination of gravity. In 1886, he became Associate Professor of Geodesy at the University of Genoa where he stayed until becoming Professor of Geodesy at the University of Pisa in 1900. He stayed in Pisa until his death in 1918.

He wrote Höhere Geodäsie (Higher Geodesy) as well as many important works on the theory of errors. He was a member of Accademia dei Lincei and the academy in Turin. He was an Invited Speaker of the ICM in 1908 at Rome. A crater on the far side of the Moon, Pizzetti, is named after him.

== See also ==
- Feodosy Krasovsky
- Karl Friedrich Küstner
- Alexander Ross Clarke
- John Fillmore Hayford
