= Carl Anton Bjerknes =

Norwegian mathematician and physicist

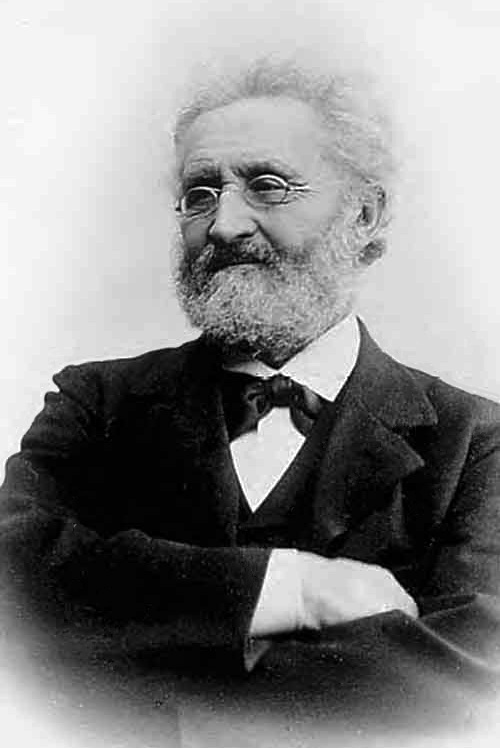
- Carl Anton Bjerknes
- Born: 24 October 1825; Oslo, Norway
- Died: 20 March 1903 (aged 77); Oslo
- Education: University of Oslo
- Known for: studies in hydrodynamics, mechanical explanation of gravitation
- Awards: Gold Medal International Exposition of Electricity in Paris
- Scientific career
- Fields: Mathematician, Physicist
- Workplaces: University of Oslo
- Doctoral students: Sophus Lie

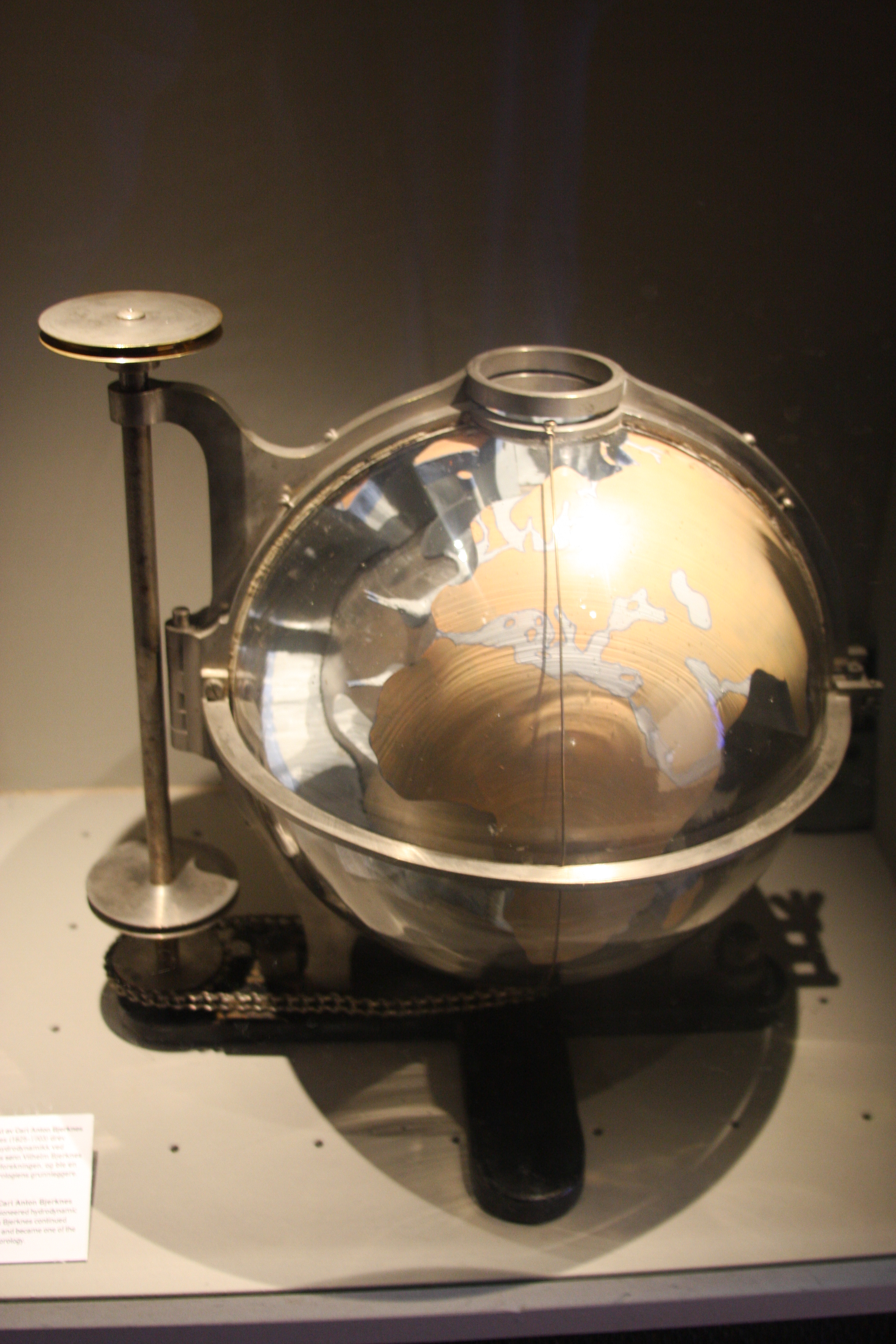
Scientific research model of the earth by Carl Anton Bjerknes. Technical Museum, Oslo.

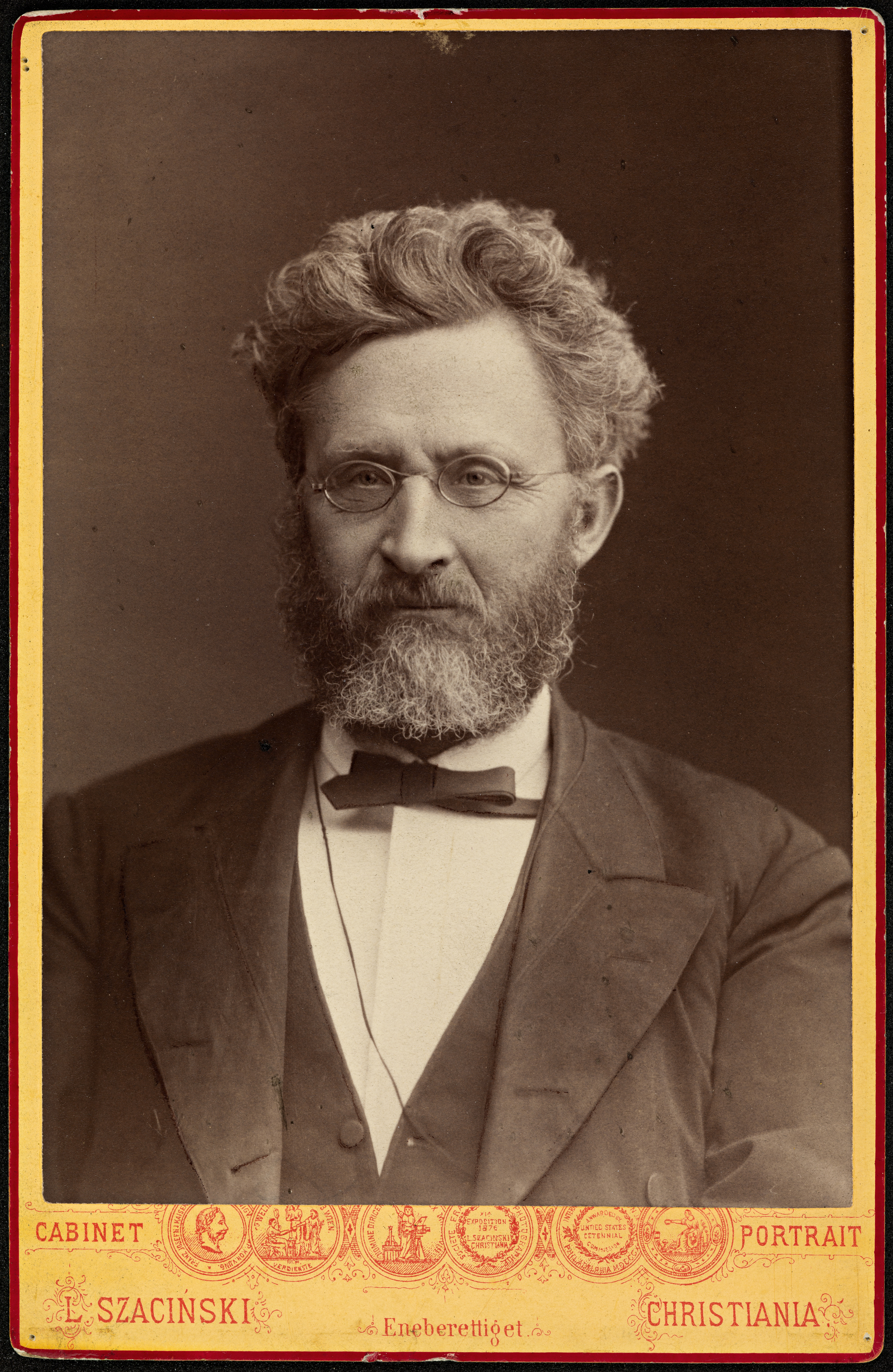
Cabinet photo of Carl Anton Bjerknes in 1883

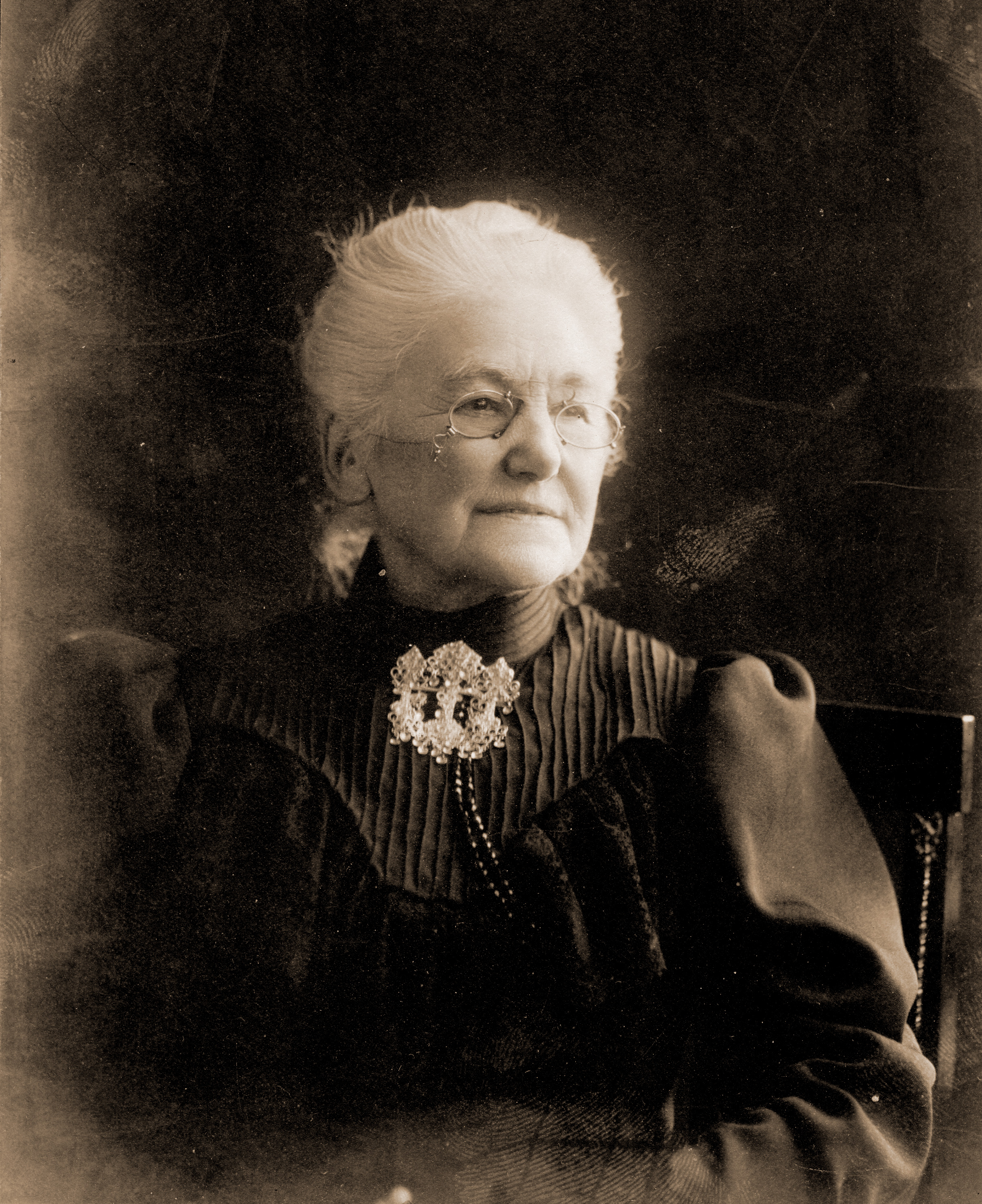
Wilhelmine Dorothea Koren Bjerknes, wife of Carl Anton Bjerknes

Carl Anton Bjerknes (/ˈbjɜːrknɪs/ BYURK-niss, Norwegian: [ˈbjæ̂rkneːs]; 24 October 1825 – 20 March 1903) was a Norwegian mathematician and physicist. Bjerknes' earlier work was in pure mathematics, but he is principally known for his studies in hydrodynamics.

== Biography ==
Carl Anton Bjerknes was born in Oslo, Norway. His father was Abraham Isaksen Bjerknes and his mother Elen Birgitte Holmen. Bjerknes studied mining at the University of Oslo, and after that mathematics at the University of Göttingen and the University of Paris. In 1866 he held a chair for applied mathematics and in 1869 for mathematics. Over a fifty-year time period, Bjerknes taught mathematics at the University of Oslo and at the military college.

A pupil of Peter Gustav Lejeune Dirichlet, Gabriel Lamé and Augustin-Louis Cauchy, Bjerknes worked for the rest of his life in the field of hydrodynamics. He tried to explain the electrodynamics of James Clerk Maxwell by hydrodynamical analogies and similarly he proposed a mechanical explanation of gravitation. Although he did not succeed in his attempts to explain all those things, his findings in the field of hydrodynamics were important. His experiments were shown at the first International Exposition of Electricity in Paris that ran from August 15, 1881 through to November 15, 1881 at the Palais de l'Industrie on the Champs-Élysées and at the Scandinavian naturalist meeting in Stockholm.

John Charles Fields the founder of the Fields Medal for outstanding achievement in mathematics had this to say about the great minds that Norway had produced since it gained independence:

...for the number of great men which Norway has produced within the comparatively short period of its national existence is quite remarkable. Niels Henrik Abel was the first of a succession of eminent mathematicians, and it is not alone in mathematics that Norwegians have distinguished themselves ... [Among those] are to be found such men as Bjerknes, Peter Ludwig Mejdell Sylow and Sophus Lie in mathematics, Bjørnstjerne Bjørnson and Henrik Ibsen in literature, Edvard Grieg and Christian Sinding in music.

== International Exposition of Electricity ==
When at the 1881 Paris International Electric Exhibition, he (Carl Anton) and his son (Vilhelm Bjerknes), demonstrated instruments that reproduced hydrodynamic analogies, few observers could ignore these baffling phenomena. Such celebrities as Hermann von Helmholtz, Gustav Kirchhoff, William Thomson (Lord Kelvin), the Siemens brothers, and the Marquis of Salisbury visited the small Norwegian exhibit booth and watched with amazement as a system of pulsating spheres and similar devices appeared to reproduce well-known electric and magnetic phenomena. For many observers the Bjerknes apparatus seemed to illustrate that the mysterious nature of electricity could perhaps be revealed. British observers allegedly exclaimed, "Maxwell should have seen this!" Of the eleven diplômes d'honneur, seven went to non-French exhibitors, including Werner Siemens, Thomas Edison, Alexander Graham Bell and William Thomson. Professor Carl Anton Bjerknes, representing Norway, joined their ranks.

== Family ==
On June 30, 1859, after returning from his foreign travels, Bjerknes married Wilhelmine Dorothea Koren (10.11.1837–21.10.1923) whose father was a minister in the Church in West Norway. His son Norwegian physicist and meteorologist, Vilhelm Bjerknes continued the work of his father.

== Death ==
Bjerknes died suddenly of a stroke on 20 March 1903 at the age of 77.

== Selected works ==
- Niels Henrik Abel. En skildring af hans liv og videnskabelige virksomhed (A description of his life and scientific activity) (Stockholm. 1880)

== Other sources ==
- O'Connor, John J.; Robertson, Edmund F., "Carl Anton Bjerknes", MacTutor History of Mathematics Archive, University of St Andrews
- Bjerknes, V. (1904), Carl Anton Bjerknes: Gedächtnisrede, Leipzig: J. A. Barth, p. 31
- Wilson, E.B. (1904), "Review: Carl Anton Bjerknes: Gedächtnisrede", Bull. Amer. Math. Soc., 10 (10): 516, doi:10.1090/S0002-9904-1904-01166-0
- Author profile in the database zbMATH
