= Pizzetti (crater) =

Crater on the Moon

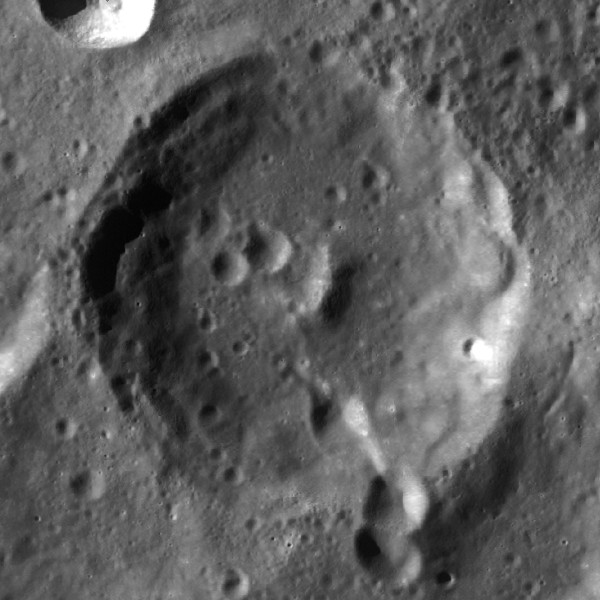
- LRO WAC image
- Coordinates: 34.9°S 118.8°E
- Diameter: 44 km
- Depth: Unknown
- Colongitude: 240° at sunrise
- Eponym: Paolo Pizzetti

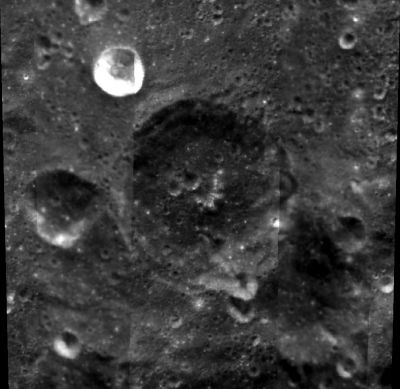
Clementine mosaic

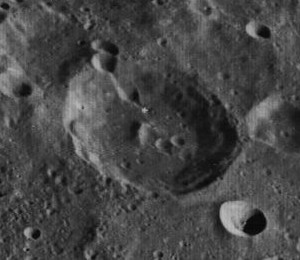
Oblique view from Lunar Orbiter 3, facing south

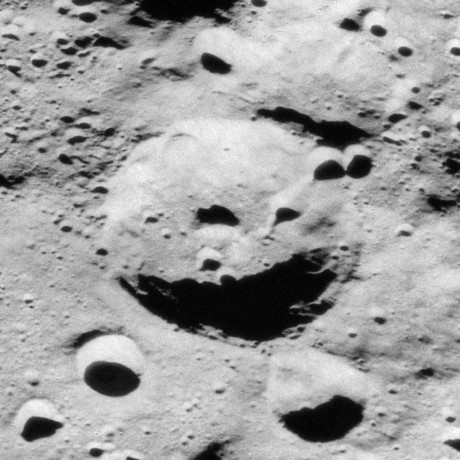
Oblique view from Apollo 17, facing east

Pizzetti is a partly eroded lunar impact crater that lies in the southern hemisphere on the far side of the Moon. It is located due north of the similar-dimensioned Clark, and to the southeast of Milne, a large walled plain. Nearly attached to the western rim is the small Tyndall. The crater is named for the Italian astronomer and geodesist Paolo Pizzetti (1860-1918).

This crater is generally circular in shape, with the south-southeastern portion of the rim bearing the greatest amount of erosion. There is a slumped shelf along the inner wall to the north and southwest. The interior floor is uneven in places and is marked by several small craterlets. The infrared spectrum of pure crystalline plagioclase has been identified on the central peak.

== Satellite craters ==
By convention these features are identified on lunar maps by placing the letter on the side of the crater midpoint that is closest to Pizzetti.

Pizzetti	Latitude	Longitude	Diameter
C	33.1° S	121.1° E	10 km
W	33.8° S	117.7° E	14 km
