= Clark (lunar crater) =

Lunar impact crater

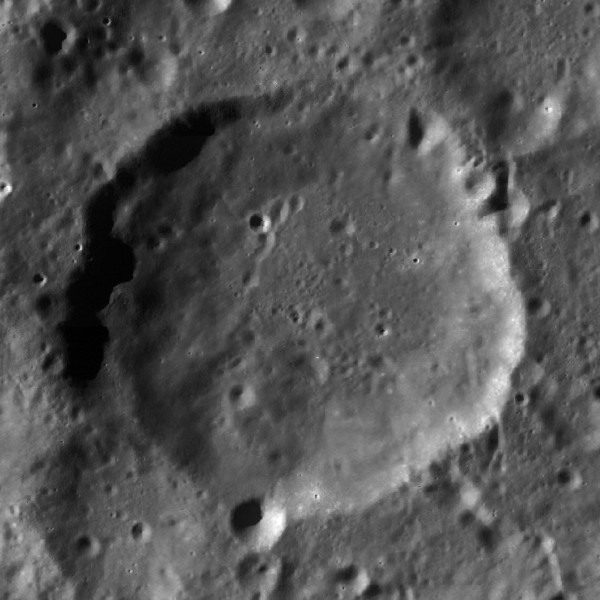
- LRO WAC image
- Coordinates: 38.4°S 118.9°E
- Diameter: 52.11 km (32.38 mi)
- Depth: Unknown
- Colongitude: 242° at sunrise
- Eponym: Alvan Clark; Alvan Graham Clark

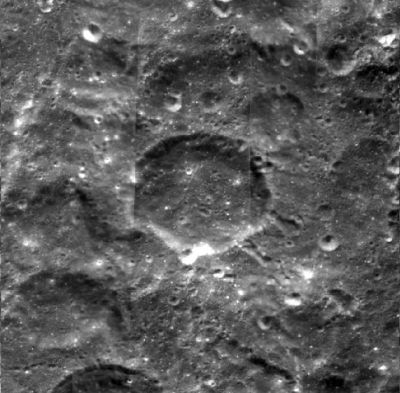
Clementine mosaic

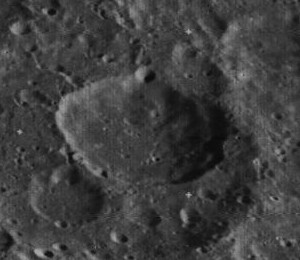
Oblique view from Lunar Orbiter 3, facing south

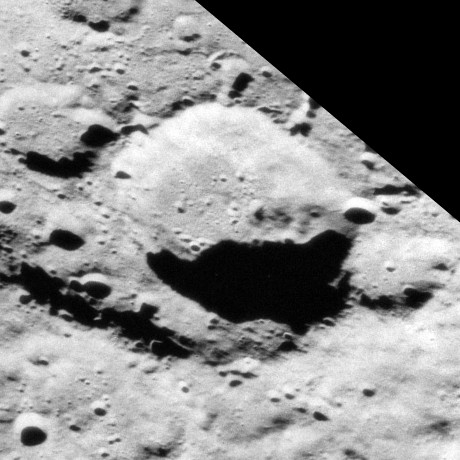
Oblique view from Apollo 17, facing east

Clark is a lunar impact crater that lies in the southern hemisphere of the Moon's far side. It is located midway between the larger walled plain named Van der Waals to the south and the similar-sized crater Pizzetti to the north.

The inner wall of Clark lacks well-formed terraces, but instead forms a narrow ridge with a wide rampart sloping down to the central floor. The rim is roughly circular, but eroded in places. A small crater lies across the southern rim, and a tiny pair are located along the northeastern crest. There is a slight outward bulge along the wall along the west-southwestern side. The crater floor is marked by a number of tiny craterlets but otherwise relatively featureless, having no central peak.

This crater is named for American astronomer and telescope maker Alvan Clark (1804–1887) and his son Alvan Graham Clark (1832–1897). Its designation was officially adopted by the International Astronomical Union in 1970.

== Satellite craters ==
By convention these features are identified on lunar maps by placing the letter on the side of the crater midpoint that is closest to Clark.

Clark	Latitude	Longitude	Diameter
F	38.4° S	122.5° E	27 km
