= Vilhelm Bjerknes =

Norwegian geophysicist and meteorologist (1862–1951)

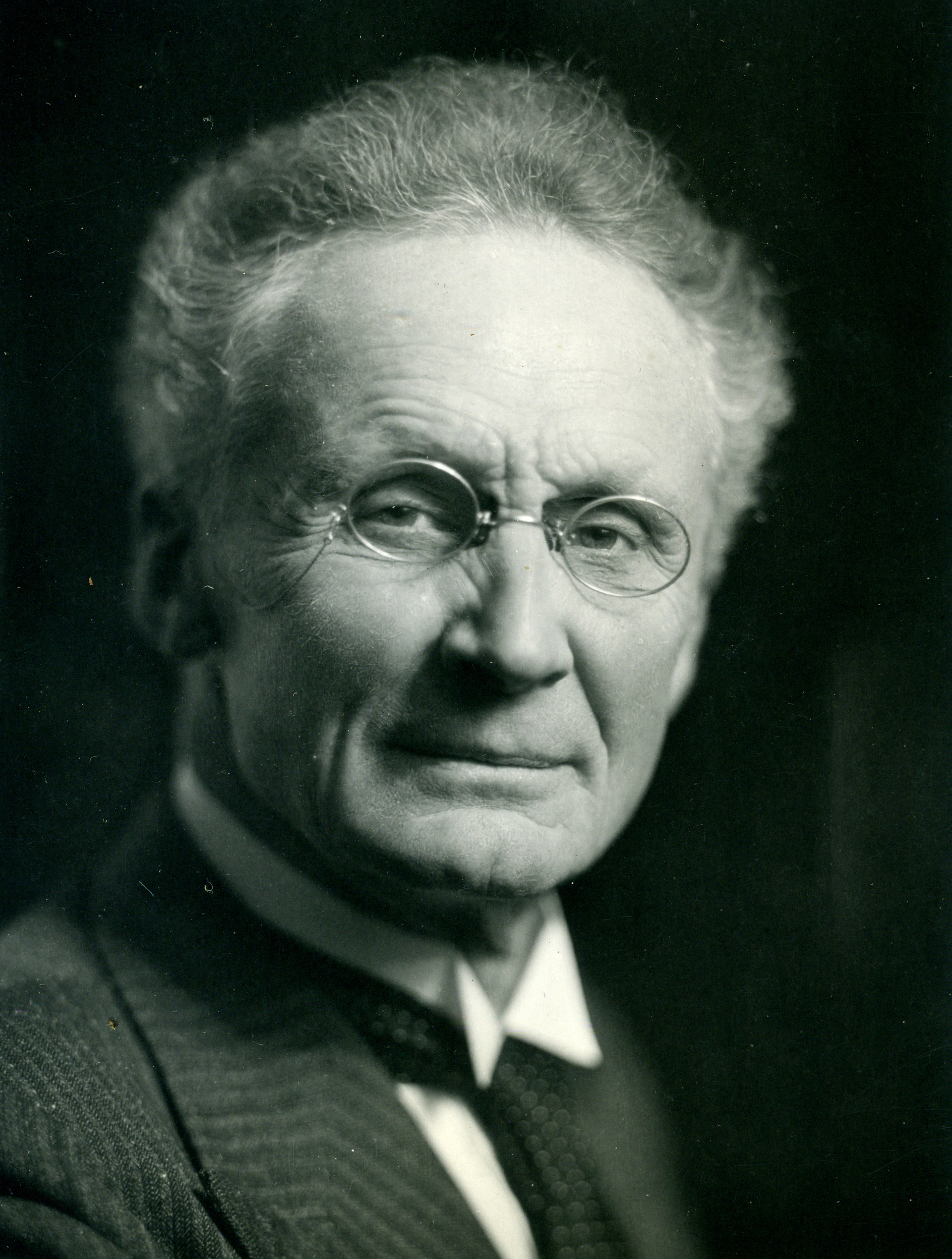
- Bjerknes, 1920s
- Born: Vilhelm Friman Koren Bjerknes; 14 March 1862; Christiania, Norway
- Died: 9 April 1951 (aged 89); Oslo, Norway
- Education: University of Bonn; Royal Frederick University
- Known for: Formulating the primitive equations; Bjerknes force (1906)
- Spouse: Honoria Bonnevie (m. 1893)
- Children: 2, including Jacob
- Father: Carl Anton Bjerknes
- Awards: Fridtjof Nansen Prize for Outstanding Research (1908); Symons Gold Medal (1932); ForMemRS (1933); Buys Ballot Medal (1933); Gunnerus Medal (1938)
- Scientific career
- Fields: Geophysics; meteorology
- Workplaces: Stockholm University (1893–1907); Royal Frederick University (1907–1912, 1926–1932); University of Leipzig (1912–1917); Geophysical Institute, University of Bergen (1917–1926)
- Doctoral advisor: Heinrich Hertz
- Other academic advisors: Carl Anton Bjerknes; Henri Poincaré
- Doctoral students: Harald Sverdrup (1917); Svein Rosseland (1927); Jørgen Holmboe (1930); Einar Høiland (1939)

Vilhelm Friman Koren Bjerknes (/ˈbjɜːrknɪs/ BYURK-niss, Norwegian: [ˈʋɪlˌhɛlm ˈbjæɾknɛs]; 14 March 1862 – 9 April 1951) was a Norwegian geophysicist and meteorologist with essential contributions to the foundation of the modern practice of weather forecasting. He formulated the primitive equations that are still in use in numerical weather prediction and climate modeling. He is the founder of the Bergen School of Meteorology, which was successful in advancing weather prediction and meteorology in the early 20th century.

== Life and career ==
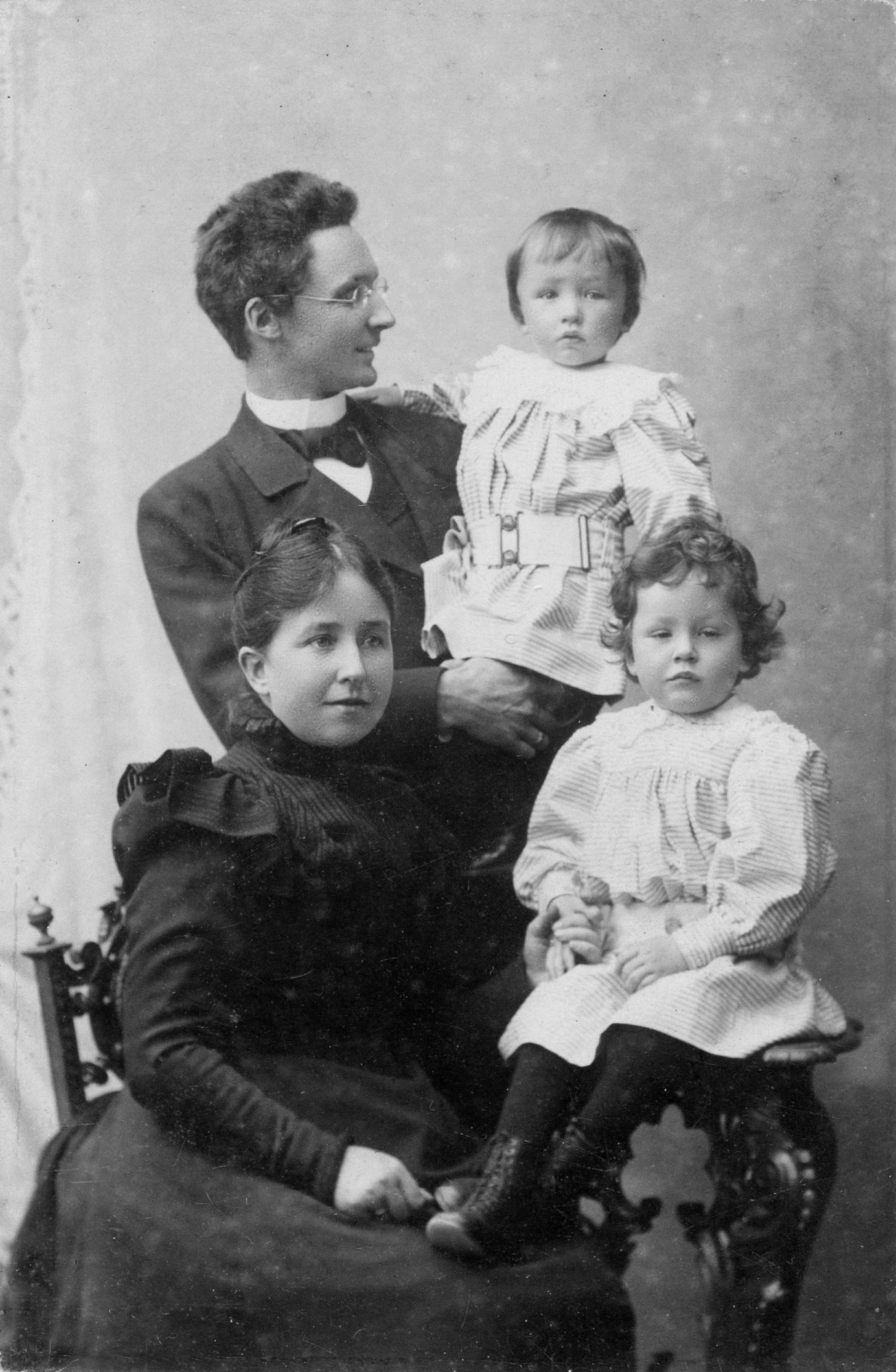
Vilhelm Bjerknes with his wife Honoria and his first two children, Karl Anton and Jacob Bjerknes, circa 1898

Born in Christiania (later renamed Oslo), Bjerknes enjoyed an early exposure to fluid dynamics, as assistant to his father, Carl Anton Bjerknes, who had discovered by mathematical analysis the apparent actions at a distance between pulsating and oscillating bodies in a fluid, and their analogy with the electric and magnetic actions at a distance. Apparently no attempt had been made to demonstrate experimentally the theories arrived at by the older professor until Vilhelm Bjerknes, then about 17 or 18 years of age, turned his mathematical knowledge and mechanical abilities to the devising of a series of instruments by which all the well-known phenomena of electricity and magnetism were illustrated and reproduced by spheres and discs and membranes set into rhythmic vibration in a bath containing a viscous fluid such as syrup. These demonstrations formed the most important exhibit in the department of physics at the Exposition Internationale d'Électricité held in Paris in 1881, and aroused greatest interest in the scientific world.

Vilhelm Bjerknes became assistant to Heinrich Hertz in Bonn 1890–1891 and made substantial contributions to Hertz' work on electromagnetic resonance. He succeeded in giving the explanation of the phenomenon called "multiple resonance," discovered by Sarasin and De la Rive. Continuing his experiments at the University of Christiania (1891–1892), he proved experimentally the influence which the conductivity and the magnetic properties of the metallic conductors exert upon the electric oscillations, and measured the depth to which the electric oscillations penetrate in metals of different conductivity and magnetic permeability (the "skin effect"). Finally, in 1895 he furnished a complete theory of the phenomenon of electric resonance, involving a method of utilizing resonance experiments for the determination of the wavelengths, and especially of the damping (the logarithmic decrement) of the oscillations in the transmitter and the receiver of the electric oscillations. These methods contributed much to the development of wireless telegraphy. His papers on electric oscillations were published in Annalen der Physik (1891–1895).

In 1895, he became professor of applied mechanics and mathematical physics at the Stockholm University where he had been lecturer since 1893. There he elucidated the fundamental interaction between fluid dynamics and thermodynamics. His major contribution was the primitive equations which are used in climate models. It was this work that inspired both V. Walfrid Ekman and Carl-Gustav Arvid Rossby to apply it to large-scale motions in the oceans and atmosphere and to make modern weather forecasting feasible. Bjerknes himself had foreseen the possible applications as early as 1904. This attack upon the meteorological problems from a hydrodynamical point of view was after 1906 supported by the Carnegie Institution of Washington, D.C., of which he became a research associate. Two introductory volumes, Statics and Kinematics, of a greater work, Dynamic Meteorology and Hydrography, were published in 1913 under the auspices of the Institution.

In his 1906 work Fields of force, Bjerknes was the first to describe and mathematically derive translational forces on bubbles in an acoustic field, now known as Bjerknes forces.

In his Vorlesungen über Hydrodynamische Fernkräfte nach C. A. Bjerknes Theorie (1900–1902) he gave the first complete mathematical and experimental exposition of the discoveries of his father, whose age and excessive self-criticism had prevented him from finishing his work himself. In a later book, Die Kraftfelder (1909), he stated the same theory in a very much generalized form according to methods of his own.

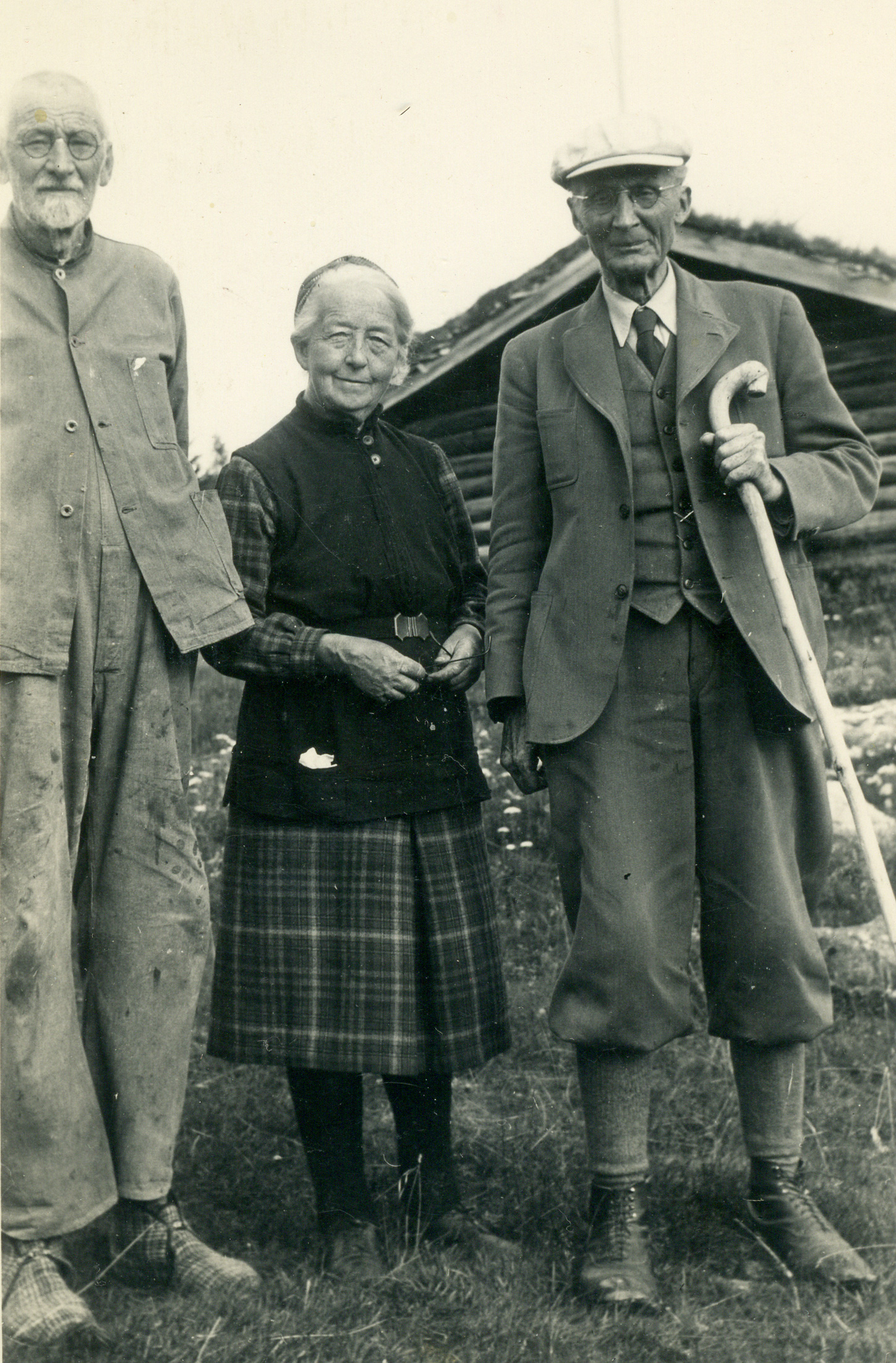
Vilhelm Bjerknes with his brother Ernst Wilhelm Bjerknes (left) and his sister-in-law, Norway's first female professor, Kristine Bonnevie at her cabin Snefugl at Mysuseter circa 1946

In 1907, Bjerknes returned to the Royal Frederick University in Oslo before becoming professor of geophysics at the University of Leipzig in 1912. In 1916, he started the publication Synoptische Darstellung atmosphärischer Zustände über Europa. In 1917, he founded the Geophysical Institute, University of Bergen where he wrote his book On the Dynamics of the Circular Vortex with Applications to the Atmosphere and to Atmospheric Vortex and Wave Motion (1921), and laid the foundation for the Bergen School of Meteorology, which was not a literal school but a school of thought on how the practice of weather forecasting and meteorology should be undertaken. He was the originator of an improved and more scientific weather service, afterwards controlled by his son and collaborator, the meteorologist Jacob Bjerknes (1897–1975).

From 1926 to his retirement in 1932, he held a position at the University of Oslo. He was elected a member of the Royal Swedish Academy of Sciences in 1905 and of the Pontifical Academy of Sciences in 1936 and a Fellow of the Royal Society. He was awarded the 1932 Symons Gold Medal of the Royal Meteorological Society.

He died of heart problems in Oslo. In 1893, Bjerknes had married Honoria Bonnevie, who in earlier years assisted him much in his scientific work. Their son Jacob Aall Bonnevie Bjerknes also became a meteorologist.

The craters Bjerknes on the Moon and Bjerknes on Mars are named in his honor. The European Geosciences Union awards the Vilhelm Bjerknes Medal annually to recognize "distinguished research in atmospheric sciences".
