= Swedish Meteorological and Hydrological Institute =

Swedish government agency

- Sveriges meteorologiska och hydrologiska institut

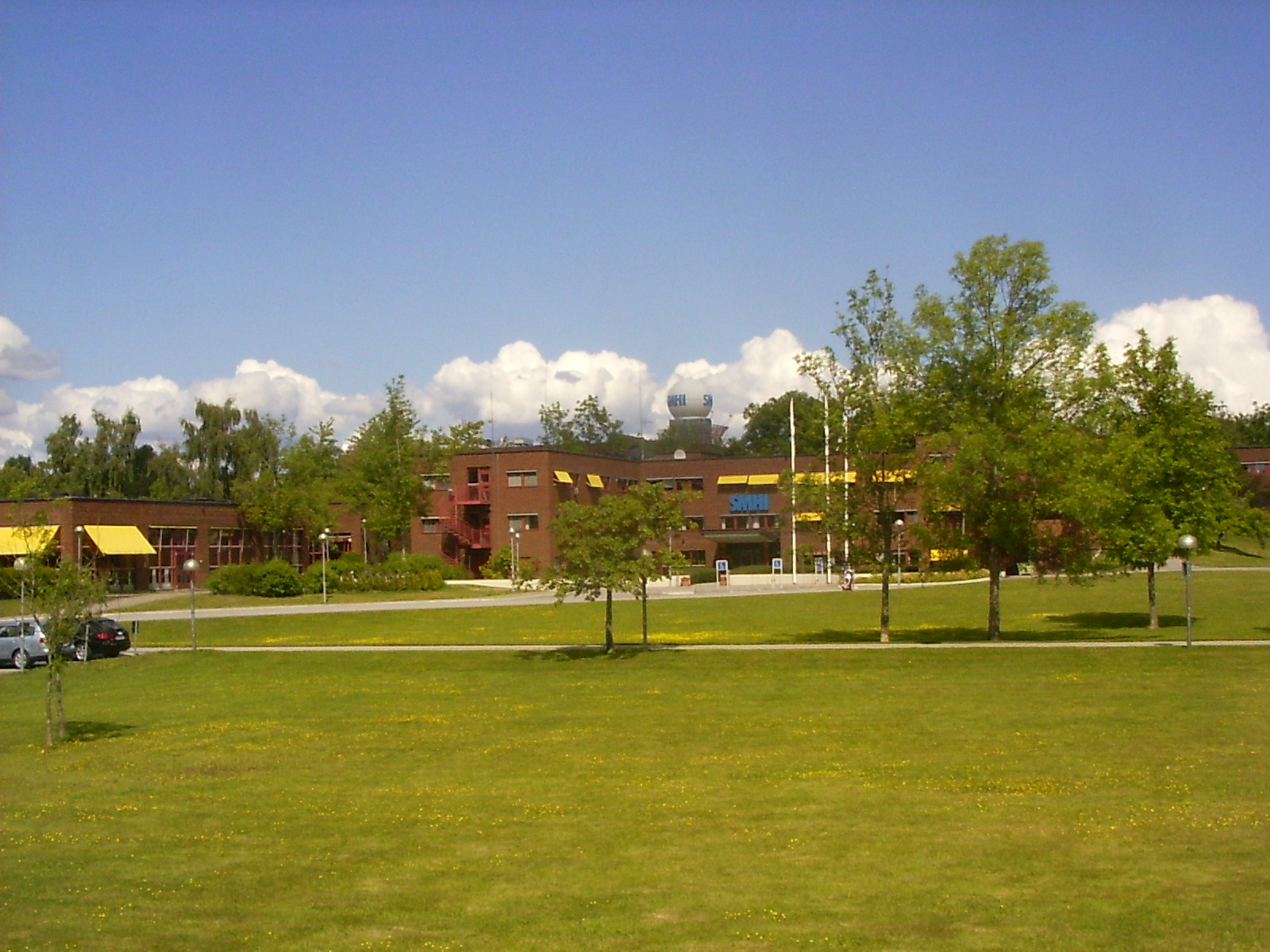
- SMHI campus in Norrköping

Agency overview
- Formed: 1 January 1873
- Headquarters: Folkborgsvägen 17, SE-601 76 Norrköping, Sweden; 58.581188°N 16.148062°E
- Parent department: Ministry of Climate and Enterprise
- Website: www.smhi.se

The Swedish Meteorological and Hydrological Institute (Swedish: Sveriges meteorologiska och hydrologiska institut, SMHI) is a Swedish government agency and operates under the Ministry of Climate and Enterprise. SMHI has expertise within the areas of meteorology, hydrology and oceanography, and has extensive service and business operations within these areas.

== History ==
On 1 January 1873, Statens Meteorologiska Centralanstalt was founded, an autonomous part of the Royal Swedish Academy of Sciences, but the first meteorological observations began on 1 July 1874. It was not until 1880 that the first forecasts were issued. The latter will be broadcast on Stockholm radio from 19 February 1924.

In 1908, the Hydrographic Office (Hydrografiska byrån, HB) was created. Its task is to scientifically map Sweden's freshwater and collaborate with the weather service in taking certain weather observations such as precipitation and snow cover. In 1919, the two services merged and became the Statens meteorologisk-hydrografiska anstalt (SMHA).

In 1945, the service was renamed Sveriges meteorologiska och hydrologiska institut. Prior to 1975 it was located in Stockholm but after a decision taken in the Riksdag in 1971 it was relocated to Norrköping in 1975.

== Staff and organisation ==
SMHI has offices in Gothenburg, Malmö, Sundsvall and Upplands Väsby, as well as its headquarters. To the Swedish public SMHI is mostly known for the weather forecasts in the public-service radio provided by Sveriges Radio. Many of the other major media companies in Sweden also buy weather forecasts from SMHI.

SMHI has about 650 employees. The research staff includes some 100 scientists at the Research Unit, which includes the Rossby Centre. The research division is divided into six units:

- Meteorological prediction and analysis
- Air quality
- Oceanography
- Hydrology
- Rossby Centre (Regional and Global Climate Modelling)
- Atmospheric Remote Sensing

The regional and global climate modelling is at the Rossby Centre, which was established at SMHI in 1997.

Environmental research spans all six research units. There is also a project for providing contributions to the HIRLAM (High Resolution Limited Area Model) project.

The main goal of the research division is to support the Institute and the society with research and development. The scientists participate in many national and international research projects.

== Air quality research ==
The air quality research unit of SMHI has 10 scientists, all of whom have expertise in air quality, atmospheric pollution transport, and atmospheric pollution dispersion modelling.

Some of the atmospheric pollution dispersion models developed by the air quality research unit are:

- the DISPERSION21 model (also called DISPERSION 2.1)
- the MATCH model

== Harassment and Corruption Issues ==
An anonymous letter sent to the Swedish ministry of environment in 2019 and written by 100 SMHI employees, claims that harassment and threats from the management happen frequently within the institution. A claim that SMHI's former general director did not wish to address thoroughly.

In 2020, it was revealed that the sea routing department was sold to its recently resigned former director for a very low price, without any public offer. The matter was reported at the Swedish parliament.
