= Rapid intensification =

Dramatic increase in a tropical cyclone's strength

Infrared satellite loop of Hurricane Otis rapidly intensifying on approach to Acapulco, Mexico, on October 24, 2023.

Rapid intensification (RI) is any process wherein a tropical cyclone strengthens very dramatically in a short period of time. Tropical cyclone forecasting agencies utilize differing thresholds for designating rapid intensification events, though the most widely used definition stipulates an increase in the maximum sustained winds of a tropical cyclone of at least 30 knots (55 km/h; 35 mph) in a 24-hour period. However, periods of rapid intensification often last longer than a day. About 20–30% of all tropical cyclones undergo rapid intensification, including a majority of tropical cyclones with peak wind speeds exceeding 51 m/s (180 km/h; 110 mph).

Rapid intensification constitutes a major source of error for tropical cyclone forecasting, and its predictability is commonly cited as a key area for improvement. The specific physical mechanisms that underlie rapid intensification and the environmental conditions necessary to support rapid intensification are unclear due to the complex interactions between the environment surrounding tropical cyclones and internal processes within the storms. Rapid intensification events are typically associated with warm sea surface temperatures and the availability of moist and potentially unstable air. The effect of wind shear on tropical cyclones is highly variable and can both enable or prevent rapid intensification. Rapid intensification events are also linked to the appearance of hot towers and bursts of strong convection within the core region of tropical cyclones, but it is not known whether such convective bursts are a cause or a byproduct of rapid intensification.

The frequency of rapid intensification has increased over the last four decades globally, both over open waters and near coastlines. The increased likelihood of rapid intensification has been linked with an increased tendency for tropical cyclone environments to enable intensification as a result of climate change. These changes may arise from warming ocean waters and the influence on climate change on the thermodynamic characteristics of the troposphere.

== Definition and nomenclature ==
Hurricane Patricia's 54 m/s (190 km/h; 120 mph; 105 kn) 24-hour wind speed increase was the largest of any tropical cyclone on record.

There is no globally consistent definition of rapid intensification. Thresholds for rapid intensification – by the magnitude of increase in maximum sustained winds and the brevity of the intensification period – are based on the distribution of high-percentile intensification cases in the respective tropical cyclone basins. The thresholds also depend on the averaging period used to assess the storm's winds. (Note: The recorded sustained speed of the wind depends on the length of time over which near-instantaneous wind speeds are averaged. In contrast to wind gust measurements, sustained wind measurements are treated as representative of the background mean wind. The World Meteorological Organization standard for gauging the mean wind is a 10-minute average, but 1-minute and 3-minute averaging periods are also commonly used to estimate tropical cyclone wind speeds.) In 2003, John Kaplan of the Hurricane Research Division and Mark DeMaria of the Regional and Mesoscale Meteorology Team at Colorado State University defined rapid intensification as an increase in the maximum one-minute sustained winds of a tropical cyclone of at least 30 knots (55 km/h; 35 mph) in a 24-hour period. This increase in winds approximately corresponds to the 95th percentile of Atlantic tropical cyclone intensity changes over water from 1989 to 2000. These thresholds for defining rapid intensification are commonly used, but other thresholds are utilized in related scientific literature. The U.S. National Hurricane Center (NHC) reflects the thresholds of Kaplan and DeMaria in its definition of rapid intensification. The NHC also defines a similar quantity, rapid deepening, as a decrease in the minimum barometric pressure in a tropical cyclone of at least 42 mbar (1.2 inHg) in 24 hours.

== Characteristics ==
Around 20–30% of all tropical cyclones experience at least one period of rapid intensification, including a majority of tropical cyclones with winds exceeding 51 m/s (180 km/h; 110 mph). The tendency for strong tropical cyclones to have undergone rapid intensification and the infrequency with which storms gradually strengthen to strong intensities leads to a bimodal distribution in global tropical cyclone intensities, with weaker and stronger tropical cyclones being more commonplace than tropical cyclones of intermediate strength. Episodes of rapid intensification typically last longer than 24 hours. Within the North Atlantic, intensification rates are on average fastest for storms with maximum one-minute sustained wind speeds of 70–80 kn (130–150 km/h; 80–90 mph). In the South-West Indian Ocean, intensification rates are fastest for storms with maximum ten-minute sustained wind speeds of 65–75 kn (120–140 km/h; 75–85 mph). Smaller tropical cyclones are more likely to undergo quick intensity changes, including rapid intensification, potentially due to a greater sensitivity to their surrounding environments. Hurricane Patricia experienced a 54 m/s (190 km/h; 120 mph) increase in its maximum sustained winds over 24 hours in 2015, setting a global record for 24-hour wind speed increase. Patricia also holds the record for the largest pressure decrease in 24 hours based on RSMC data, deepening 97 mbar (2.9 inHg). However, other estimates suggest Typhoon Forrest's central pressure may have deepened by as much as 104 mbar (3.1 inHg) in 1983, and the World Meteorological Organization lists Forrest's intensification rate as the fastest on record. In 2019, the Joint Typhoon Warning Center (JTWC) estimated that Cyclone Ambali's winds increased by 51 m/s (180 km/h; 110 mph) in 24 hours, marking the highest 24-hour wind speed increase for a tropical cyclone in the Southern Hemisphere since at least 1980.

Bursts of convection in the core region of tropical cyclones are associated with rapid intensification, as seen here with Hurricane Delta.

Tropical cyclones frequently become more axisymmetric prior to rapid intensification, with a strong relationship between a storm's degree of axisymmetry during initial development and its intensification rate. However, the asymmetric emergence of strong convection and hot towers near within inner core of tropical cyclones can also portend rapid intensification. The development of localized deep convection (termed "convective bursts") increases the structural organization of tropical cyclones in the upper troposphere and offsets the entrainment of drier and more stable air from the lower stratosphere, but whether bursts of deep convection induce rapid intensification or vice versa is unclear. Hot towers have been implicated in rapid intensification, though they have diagnostically seen varied impacts across basins. The frequency and intensity of lightning in the inner core region may be related to rapid intensification. A survey of tropical cyclones sampled by the Tropical Rainfall Measuring Mission suggested that rapidly intensifying storms were distinguished from other storms by the large extent and high magnitude of rainfall in their inner core regions. However, the physical mechanisms that drive rapid intensification do not appear to be fundamentally different from those that drive slower rates of intensification.

Microwave imagery of Typhoon Jelawat during a period of rapid intensification in March 2018

The characteristics of environments in which storms rapidly intensify do not vastly differ from those that engender slower intensification rates. High sea surface temperatures and oceanic heat content are potentially crucial in enabling rapid intensification. Waters with strong horizontal SST gradients or strong salinity stratification may favor stronger air–sea fluxes of enthalpy and moisture, providing more conducive conditions for rapid intensification. The presence of a favorable environment alone does not always lead to rapid intensification. Vertical wind shear adds additional uncertainty in predicting the behavior of storm intensity and the timing of rapid intensification. The presence of wind shear concentrates convective available potential energy (CAPE) and helicity and strengthens inflow within the downshear (Note: The downshear side of a tropical cyclone is the side in the direction of the wind shear vector, analogous to downwind. The upshear side of a tropical cyclone is the side opposite the direction of the wind shear vector, analogous to upwind.) region of the tropical cyclone. Such conditions are conducive to vigorous rotating convection, which can induce rapid intensification if located close enough to the tropical cyclone's core of high vorticity. However, wind shear also concurrently produces conditions unfavorable to convection within a tropical cyclone's upshear region by entraining dry air into the storm and inducing subsidence. These upshear conditions can be brought into the initially favorable downshear regions, becoming deleterious to the tropical cyclone's intensity and forestalling rapid intensification. Simulations also suggest that rapid intensification episodes are sensitive to the timing of wind shear. Tropical cyclones that undergo rapid intensification in the presence of moderate (5–10 m/s (20–35 km/h; 10–20 mph)) wind shear may exhibit similarly asymmetric convective structures. In such cases, outflow from the sheared tropical cyclone may interact with the surrounding environment in ways that locally reduce wind shear and permit further intensification. The interaction of tropical cyclones with upper-tropospheric troughs can also be conducive to rapid intensification, particularly when involving troughs with shorter wavelengths and larger distances between the trough and the tropical cyclone.

Within environments favorable for rapid intensification, stochastic internal processes within storms play a larger role in modulating the rate of intensification. In some cases, the onset of rapid intensification is preceded by the large release of convective instability from moist air (characterized by high equivalent potential temperature), enabling an increase in convection around the center of the tropical cyclone. Rapid intensification events may also be related to the character and distribution of convection about the tropical cyclone. One study indicated that a substantial increase in stratiform precipitation throughout the storm signified the beginning of rapid intensification. In 2023, a National Center for Atmospheric Research study of rapid intensification using computer simulations identified two pathways for tropical cyclones to rapidly intensifying. In the "marathon" mode of rapid intensification, conducive environmental conditions including low wind shear and high SSTs promote symmetric intensification of tropical cyclone at a relatively moderate pace over a prolonged period. The "sprint" mode of rapid intensification is faster and more brief, but typically occurs in conditions long assumed to be unfavorable for intensification, such as in the presence of strong wind shear. This faster mode involves convective bursts removed from the tropical cyclone center that can rearrange the storm circulation or produce a new center of circulation. The modeled tropical cyclones undergoing the sprint mode of rapid intensification tended to peak at lower intensities (sustained winds below 51 m/s (185 km/h; 115 mph)) than those undergoing the marathon mode of rapid intensification.

== Improving predictability and forecasting ==
Rapid intensification forecasting has been recognized by Regional Specialized Meteorological Centers as a key area for improvement.

Rapid intensification is a significant source of error in tropical cyclone forecasting, and the timing of rapid intensification episodes has low predictability. Rapid intensity changes near land can greatly influence tropical cyclone preparedness and public risk perception. Increasing the predictability of rapid intensity changes has been identified as a top priority by operational forecasting centers. In 2012, the NHC listed prediction of rapid intensification as their highest priority item for improvement. Genesis and Rapid Intensification Processes (GRIP) was a field experiment led by NASA Earth Science to in part study rapid intensification. Multiple aircraft including the uncrewed Northrop Grumman RQ-4 Global Hawk were used to probe the rapid intensification events of hurricanes Earl and Karl during the 2010 Atlantic hurricane season. In December 2016, the CYGNSS SmallSat constellation was launched with a goal of measure ocean surface wind speeds with sufficiently high temporal resolution to resolve rapid intensification events. The TROPICS satellite constellation includes studying rapid changes in tropical cyclones as one of its core science objectives. Weather models have also shown an improved ability to project rapid intensification events, but continue to face difficulties in accurately depicting their timing and magnitude. Statistical models show greater forecast skill in anticipating rapid intensification compared to dynamical weather models. Intensity predictions derived from artificial neural networks may also provide more accurate predictions of rapid intensification than established methods.

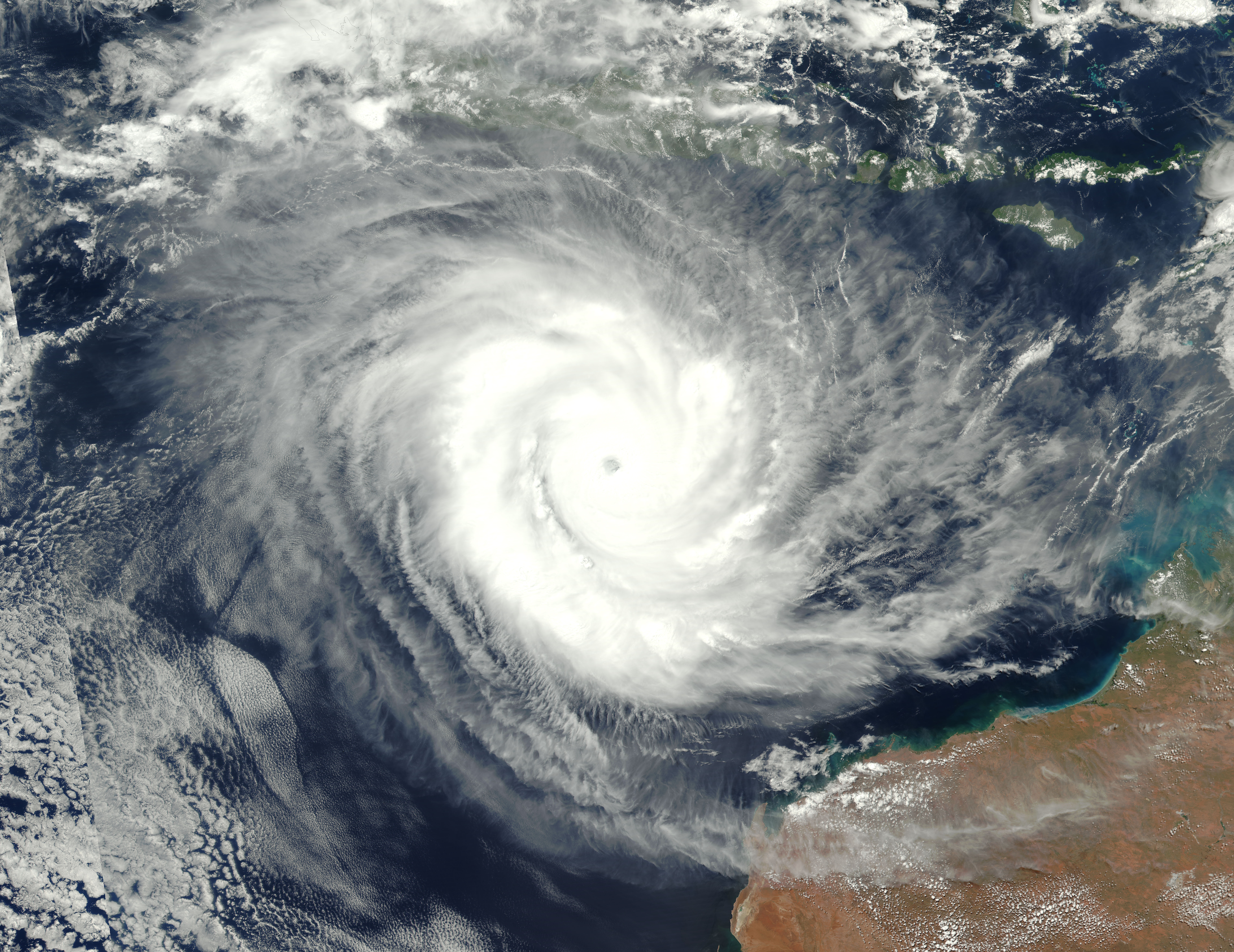
Cyclone Marcus was an instance in which operational intensity forecasts successfully predicted rapid intensification with the aid of RI forecast aids.

Because forecast errors at 24-hour leadtimes are greater for rapidly intensifying tropical cyclones than other cases, operational forecasts do not typically depict rapid intensification. Probabilistic and deterministic forecasting tools have been developed to increase forecast confidence and aid forecasters in anticipating rapid intensification episodes. These aids have been integrated into the operational forecasting procedures of Regional Specialized Meteorological Centers (RSMCs) and are factored into tropical cyclone intensity forecasts worldwide. For example, the Rapid Intensification Index (RII) – a quantification of the likelihood of rapid intensification for varying degrees of wind increases based on forecasts of environmental parameters – is utilized by RSMC Tokyo–Typhoon Center, the Australian Bureau of Meteorology (BOM), and the NHC. An intensity prediction product is being developed at RSMC La Réunion for the South-West Indian Ocean based on tools developed in other tropical cyclone basins. The Rapid Intensity Prediction Aid (RIPA) increases the consensus intensity forecast provided by the JTWC's principal tropical cyclone intensity forecasting aid if at least a 40% chance of rapid intensification is assessed and has been used since 2018. The JTWC reported that a large increasing trend in the probability of rapid intensification assessed using RIPA was associated with higher likelihoods of rapid intensification. The JTWC is also experimenting with additional rapid intensification forecasting aids relying on a variety of statistical methods. Intensity forecasting tools incorporating predictors for rapid intensification are also being developed and used in operations at other forecasting agencies such as the Korea Meteorological Administration and the Indian Meteorological Department.

== Trends ==
The first working group report of the IPCC Sixth Assessment Report – published in 2021 – assessed that the global occurrence of rapid intensification likely increased over the preceding four decades (during the period of reliable satellite data), with "medium confidence" in this change exceeding the effect of natural climate variability and thus stemming from anthropogenic climate change. The likelihood of a tropical cyclone with hurricane-force winds undergoing rapid intensification has increased from 1 percent in the 1980s to 5 percent. Statistically significant increases in the frequency of tropical cyclones undergoing multiple episodes of rapid intensification have also been observed since the 1980s. These increases have been observed across the various tropical cyclone basins and may be associated with the thermodynamic properties of environments becoming increasingly conducive to intensification as a result of anthropogenic emissions. Reductions of wind shear due to climate change may also increase the probability of rapid intensification. The frequency of rapid intensification within 400 km (250 mi) of coastlines has also tripled between 1980 and 2020. This trend may be caused by a warming of coastal waters and a westward trend in the locations of peak tropical cyclone intensities stemming from broader changes to environmental steering flows. A long-term increase in the magnitude of rapid intensification has also been observed over the central and tropical Atlantic as well as the western North Pacific. However, CMIP5 climate projections suggest that environmental conditions in by the end of the 21st century may be less favorable for rapid intensification in all tropical cyclone basins outside of the North Indian Ocean.

== See also ==
- List of the most intense tropical cyclones
- List of tropical cyclone records
- Annular tropical cyclone
