= Convective self-aggregation =

Atmospheric phenomenon that occurs in idealised simulations

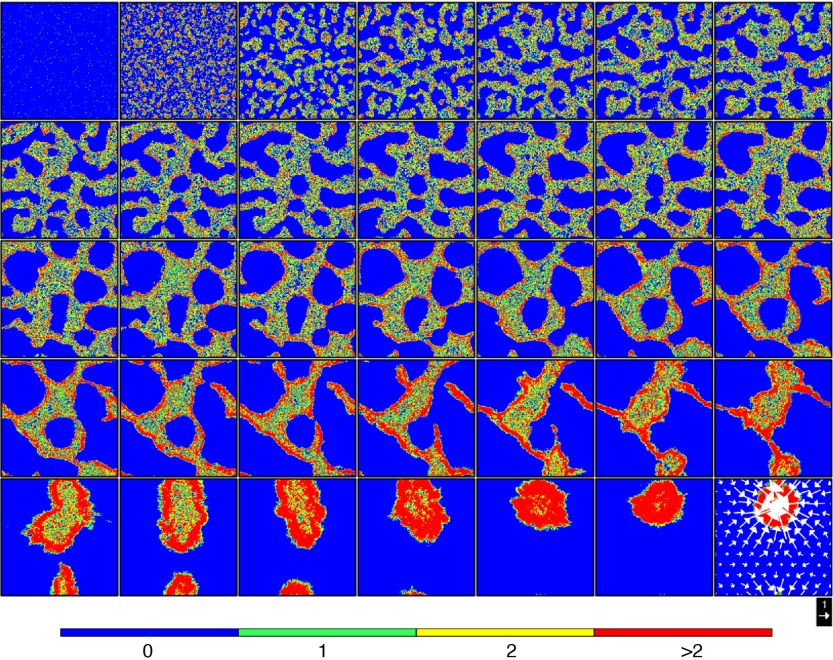
Evolution of self-aggregated convection. Each frame denotes a day. The color describes the frequency of occurrence of convection. Arrows in the last frame denote horizontal surface winds. Taken from Hohenegger and Stevens.

Convective self-aggregation is an atmospheric phenomenon that occurs under idealised homogeneous conditions without external forcing. An unorganized atmosphere with scattered convection spontaneously transitions into a state with a very dry and cloud-free region, and a region with heavy rain and thunderstorms. The aggregated state appears in simulations after 15-100 days and has a length scale of multiple thousand kilometres. In contrast to forced convective organization, self-aggregation is induced by positive feedbacks from the convection itself. Some known feedbacks come from radiation, cloud entrainment, cold pools, waves or surface fluxes. These feedbacks facilitate cloud forming near existing clouds and hamper cloud forming distant to clouds. Convective self-aggregation affects the formation of tropical cyclones, rainfall intensity, and the radiative budget through changes in the mean thermodynamic properties. In nature, convective self-aggregation is hard to isolate from forced aggregation and is hence studied mainly in numerical simulations.

== Scales ==
Convective self-aggregation occurs after 15-100 days in model simulations, depending on the model used, domain size, grid spacing, surface conditions (like the sea surface temperature (SST)) and suppression of relevant mechanisms (like rain evaporation). The horizontal scale of an aggregated cluster is constrained by the domain size. In domain sizes of less than 5.000 km, one cluster forms that takes up approximately 25 % of the total domain. In larger domain sizes, multiple clusters can form. For convective clusters in rotating simulations the Rossby radius of deformation is a relevant length scale.

== Mechanisms ==
=== Radiative feedback ===
Dry regions in the troposphere more efficiently cool due to the emission of longwave radiation compared to moist regions. This enhanced radiative cooling leads to subsidence of the dry air. The subsiding dry air is less buoyant than air in the moist regions, which makes the forming of new convection in the dry regions less likely. In addition, the subsiding dry regions together with the convecting moist regions drive a low level circulation that transports moist static energy near the surface from dry regions to moist regions. The circulation reinforces the moist static energy gradient and the moist regions become moister while the dry regions become drier. The speed of self-aggregation depends on the strength of the low level circulation. The radiative feedback is necessary for the initiation of convective self-aggregation in non-rotating simulations.

=== Cloud entrainment feedback ===
Turbulent entrainmanet exchanges saturated air from within the cloud with unsaturated air outside the cloud. This effect weakens the convective updraft because the air outside is drier and thus less buoyant than the air inside the convective updraft. If convection is near other convection, the surrounding air tends to be moister and the cloud entrainment feedback is less efficient.

=== Cold pool feedback ===
Cold pools can help convection to self-aggregate by triggering new convection in the proximity of existing convection, for example by mechanical lifting of environmental air at the gust front as the cold pool spreads along the surface. However, cold pools were also shown to prevent self-aggregation, as they are responsible for a minimum domain size threshold from which self-aggregation can occur. Without cold pools, self-aggregation occurs at all domain sizes.

=== Wave feedback ===
Convection triggers internal gravity waves that propagate away from the convective cell. The internal gravity waves form a standing wave pattern. The peaks of the gravity waves are characterised by anomalously high geopotential, which facilitates new convection near old convection.

=== Surface flux feedback ===
Surface winds are stronger in the convective regions, which increases surface fluxes. Stronger surface fluxes help triggering more convection. The surface flux feedback plays a role in the initiation and early development of self-aggregation. After an aggregated state is established, surface fluxes work against the aggregation because the moisture disequilibrium between the sea surface and the air above is stronger in the non-convecting regions. For rotating aggregation the surface flux feedback stays positive throughout. The SST affects the surface fluxes but the effect on self-aggregation is still debated.

== Implications ==
Tropical cyclones can develop out of mesoscale self-aggregated clusters. However, tropical cyclones form in the nature usually from preexisting disturbances and the feedbacks that lead to self-aggregation play a subordinate role. Aggregated convection leads locally to more intense rainfall because less unsaturated air from the environment can be entrained and the reevaporation of rain is reduced. The free troposphere dries and warms substantially in the domain-mean when convection is aggregated and the high-cloud fraction is decreased. Especially the clear-sky drying increases the outgoing longwave radiation (OLR) at the top of the atmosphere.

== Observational evidence ==
Convective self-aggregation is usually studied in idealized simulations because in nature the self-aggregation is diluted by large scale variability due to its slow development. Self-aggregation is also hard to isolate from forced aggregation (e.g. by SST gradients). Nevertheless, satellite observations show a general decrease of free-tropospheric humidity, enhanced surface fluxes in convective areas and higher OLR with an increased degree of aggregation, which is consistent with idealized simulations.
