= Hot tower =

Type of tropical cumulonimbus cloud

A NASA Global Hawk detects a hot tower measuring over 12 km (7.5 mi) high within the eyewall of Hurricane Karl on September 16, 2010.

A hot tower is a tropical cumulonimbus cloud that reaches out of the lowest layer of the atmosphere, the troposphere, and into the stratosphere. These formations are called "hot" because of the large amount of latent heat released as water vapor that condenses into liquid and freezes into ice within the cloud. Hot towers in regions of sufficient vorticity may acquire rotating updrafts; these are known as vortical hot towers. In some instances, hot towers appear to develop characteristics of a supercell, with deep and persistent rotation present in the updraft. The role of hot towers in tropical weather was first formulated by Joanne Simpson in 1958. Hot towers dominated discussions in tropical meteorology in the 1960s and are now considered the main drivers of rising air within tropical cyclones and a major component of the Hadley circulation. Although the prevalence of hot towers in scientific literature decreased in the 1970s, hot towers remain an active area of research. The presence of hot towers in tropical cyclones is correlated with an increase in the tropical cyclones' intensities.

== Observation ==
Hot towers were first detected by radar in the 1950s. Aerial reconnaissance was used to probe hot towers, though planes avoided the most dangerous cores of hot towers due to safety concerns. The launch of the Tropical Rainfall Measuring Mission (TRMM) in 1997 provided the resolution and coverage necessary to systematically catalog hot towers and precisely assess their structure globally. Prior to 1997, the small size and short duration of hot towers limited studies of hot towers to aerial observations as the resolutions of satellite sensors at microwave and infrared wavelengths were too coarse to properly resolve details within hot towers.

== Structure ==
The term hot tower has been applied to both rapidly rising parcels of air and the tall cumulonimbus clouds that accompany them. The regions of rising air are horizontally small and span about 2–4 km (1.2–2.5 mi) across. Their greatest extent is in the vertical, reaching altitudes as high as 18 km (11 mi) and exhibiting high reflectivity. Hot towers are effectively undilute; as they ascend, the surrounding air does not mix with the rising parcels of air. As a result, the equivalent potential temperature within a hot tower remains nearly constant throughout their entire vertical extent. This allows for efficient transport of heat from the lower troposphere to the stratosphere. Hot towers forming within areas of rotation may feature rotating updrafts; these are known as vortical hot towers and are associated with localized regions of anomalous vertical vorticity.

== Conceptual development ==
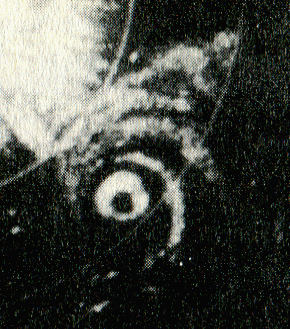
Aerial studies of Hurricane Daisy in 1958 were pivotal in validating the relationship between hot towers and tropical cyclones

Before the 1950s, the mechanism driving atmospheric Hadley cells—an air circulation that transports tropical heat and moisture poleward—was poorly understood. It was initially believed that the Hadley cell was fueled by the broad, diffuse, and gradual rise of warm and moist air near the equator. However calculations of Earth's energy budget using data from World War II showed that the mid-troposphere was an energy deficit region, indicating that the maintenance of the Hadley cell could not be explained by the broad ascent of air. The role of the tropical regions in the global climate system and the development of tropical disturbances were also poorly understood. The 1950s marked a pivotal decade that saw the advancement of tropical meteorology, including the creation of the U.S. National Hurricane Research Project in 1956. In 1958, Herbert Riehl and Joanne Simpson proposed that the release of latent heat caused by condensation within hot towers supplied the energy necessary to maintain Hadley cells and the trade winds; their hypothesis was initially based on aerial observations made by Simpson during her time at Woods Hole Oceanographic Institution. This mechanism required the existence of undilute cumulonimbus clouds that did not entrain the surrounding air, allowing for the efficient transfer of heat from the ocean surface into the upper troposphere. The existence of 1,500–2,500 of these clouds was required if they were to support the Hadley circulation. The researchers also argued that hot towers helped maintain the warmth present at the center of tropical cyclones and that the ascent of moist air within tropical cyclones was concentrated around the hot towers. In their original 1958 paper outlining the role of hot towers, Riehl and Simpson described these clouds as "narrow warm towers", but began terming the idea as the "hot tower hypothesis" by 1960. For the next two decades, hot towers dominated scientific discussion concerning the interaction between cumulus clouds and their larger-scale tropical environments.

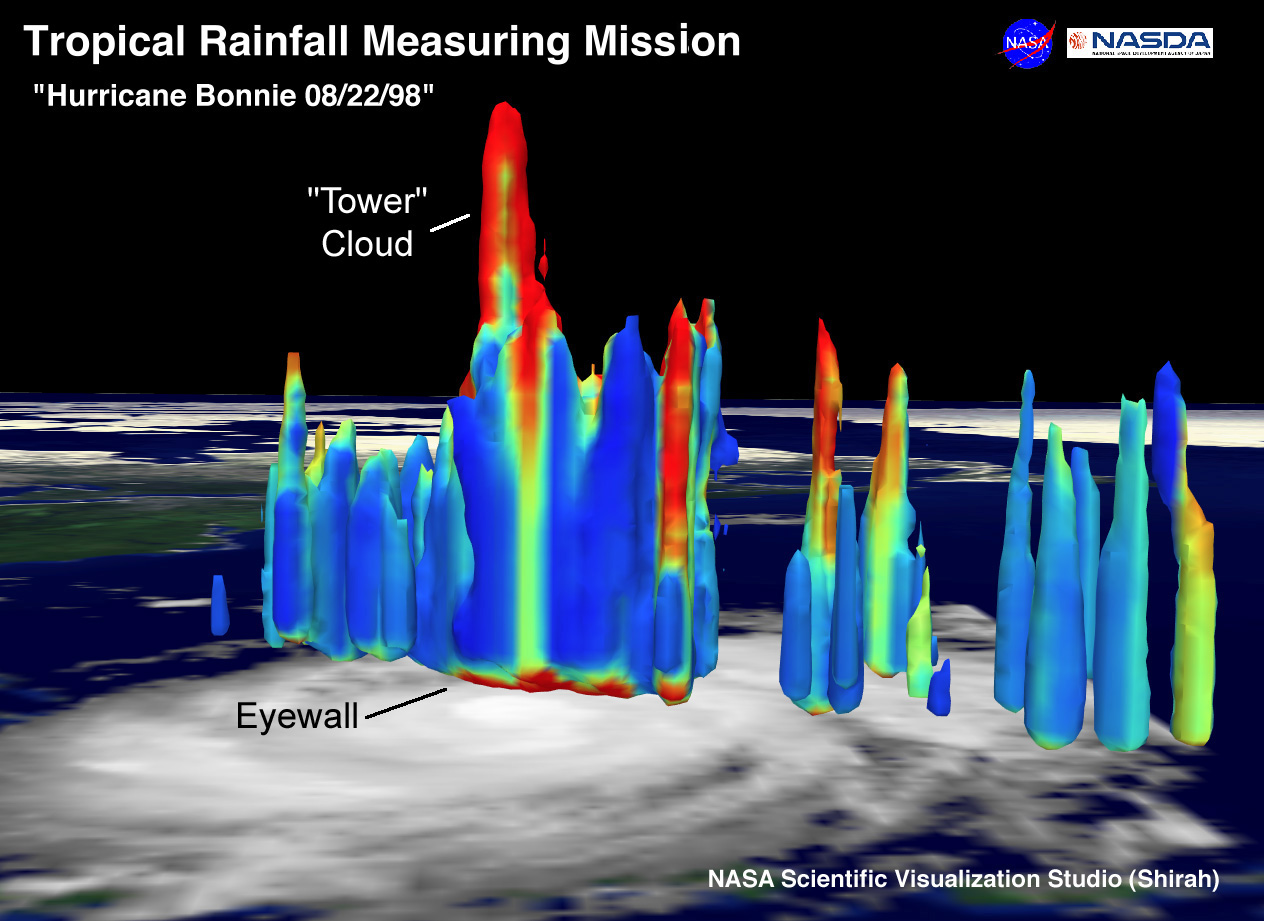
Visualization of a hot tower in Hurricane Bonnie (1998). Cloud heights are exaggerated.

Aerial observations of Hurricane Daisy in 1958 suggested that convection within tropical cyclones was limited to a few areas of cumulonimbus clouds, dispelling the idea that rising air was distributed throughout the entire cyclone's envelope and lending support for the hot tower hypothesis. In the case of Hurricane Daisy, the convecting cumulonimbus clouds represented only about four percent of the total region of precipitation associated with the hurricane. A 1961 analysis by Riehl and Simpson using the NHRP data from Hurricane Daisy concluded that hot towers were the principal mechanism by which tropical cyclones move warm air into the upper troposphere. The newfound importance of hot towers in tropical cyclones motivated the development of parametrization—the representation of small-scale phenomena and interactions, i.e. individual cumulus clouds—in early weather models. The hot tower hypothesis also inspired the development of convective instability of the second kind (CISK): a conceptual model that emphasized the feedbacks between the latent heat released by individual cumuli and the convergence associated with tropical cyclones. By the 1970s, many of the ideas and predictions put forth by the hot tower hypothesis had been validated by empirical observations. Critics of the hot tower hypothesis contended it was implausible that a cumulonimbus cloud could be free of entrainment. This facet of the hypothesis remained untested until dropsondes released into hot towers as part of the Convection and Moisture Experiment in 1998 provided the first direct measurements of the thermodynamic structure of hot towers. The data showed that the equivalent potential temperature within hot towers was virtually constant across their entire vertical extent, confirming the lack of entrainment. Other field observations have suggested that some tropical updrafts are diluted by their surrounding environments at altitudes lower than 5 km (3.1 mi), though strong latent heat generated by ice within the cloud was sufficient to provide the requisite input energy for the Hadley circulation. Scientific research of hot towers experienced a resurgence in the 2000s with a renewed focus on their role in tropical cyclogenesis and tropical cyclone development.

== Effect on tropical cyclones ==
Vortical hot towers aid in the formation of tropical cyclones by producing many small-scale positive anomalies of potential vorticity, which eventually coalesce to strengthen the broader storm. The high vorticity present in the hot towers traps the latent heat released by those clouds, while the merger of the hot towers aggregates this enhanced warmth. These processes are the major part of the initial formation of a tropical cyclone's warm core—the anomalous warmth at the center of such a system—and the increased angular momentum of the winds encircling the developing cyclone.

In 2007, the National Aeronautics and Space Administration (NASA) hypothesized that the wind shear between the eye and the eyewall could enhance updraft through the center of a cyclone and generate convection. Hot towers may appear when a cyclone is about to intensify, possibly rapidly. A particularly tall hot tower rose above Hurricane Bonnie in August 1998, as the storm intensified before striking North Carolina.

== See also ==
- List of cloud types
- Pileus
- Overshooting top
- Rapid intensification

== Bibliography ==
- Anthes, Richard A. (2003). "Hot Towers and Hurricanes: Early Observations, Theories, and Models". In Tao, Wei-Kuo; Adler, Robert (eds.). Cloud Systems, Hurricanes, and the Tropical Rainfall Measuring Mission (TRMM). Boston, Massachusetts: American Meteorological Society. pp. 139–148. doi:10.1007/978-1-878220-63-9_10. ISBN 978-1-878220-63-9 – via Springer Link.
- Fierro, Alexandre O.; Simpson, Joanne; LeMone, Margaret A.; Straka, Jerry M.; Smull, Bradley F. (September 2009). "On How Hot Towers Fuel the Hadley Cell: An Observational and Modeling Study of Line-Organized Convection in the Equatorial Trough from TOGA COARE". Journal of the Atmospheric Sciences. 66 (9). Boston, Massachusetts: American Meteorological Society: 2730–2746. Bibcode:2009JAtS...66.2730F. doi:10.1175/2009JAS3017.1.
- Guimond, Stephen R.; Heymsfield, Gerald M.; Turk, F. Joseph (March 2010). "Multiscale Observations of Hurricane Dennis (2005): The Effects of Hot Towers on Rapid Intensification". Journal of the Atmospheric Sciences. 67 (3). Boston, Massachusetts: American Meteorological Society: 633–654. Bibcode:2010JAtS...67..633G. doi:10.1175/2009JAS3119.1. hdl:11603/28559.
- Hendricks, Eric A.; Montgomery, Michael T.; Davis, Christopher A. (June 2004). "The Role of "Vortical" Hot Towers in the Formation of Tropical Cyclone Diana (1984)". Journal of the Atmospheric Sciences. 61 (11). Boston, Massachusetts: American Meteorological Society: 1209–1232. Bibcode:2004JAtS...61.1209H. doi:10.1175/1520-0469(2004)061<1209:TROVHT>2.0.CO;2.
- Heymsfield, Gerald M.; Tian, Lin; Heymsfield, Andrew J.; Li, Lihua; Guimond, Stephen (1 February 2010). "Characteristics of Deep Tropical and Subtropical Convection from Nadir-Viewing High-Altitude Airborne Doppler Radar". Journal of the Atmospheric Sciences. 67 (2). Boston, Massachusetts: American Meteorological Society: 285–308. Bibcode:2010JAtS...67..285H. doi:10.1175/2009JAS3132.1. hdl:11603/28558. S2CID 54697840.
- Houze, Robert A. Jr. (January 2003). "From Hot Towers to TRMM: Joanne Simpson and Advances in Tropical Convection Research". Meteorological Monographs. 29 (51). Boston, Massachusetts: American Meteorological Society: 37–47. Bibcode:2003MetMo..29...37H. doi:10.1175/0065-9401(2003)029<0037:CFHTTT>2.0.CO;2 (inactive 12 July 2025).
- Leppert, Kenneth D.; Petersen, Walter A. (March 2010). "Electrically Active Hot Towers in African Easterly Waves prior to Tropical Cyclogenesis". Monthly Weather Review. 138 (3). Boston, Massachusetts: American Meteorological Society: 663–687. Bibcode:2010MWRv..138..663L. doi:10.1175/2009MWR3048.1.
- Malkus, Joanne S.; Ronne, Claude; Chaffe, Margaret (January 1961). "Cloud Patterns in Hurricane Daisy, 1958". Tellus. 13 (1): 8–30. doi:10.3402/tellusa.v13i1.9439 – via Taylor & Francis Online.
- Malkus, Joanne S.; Williams, R. T. (September 1963). "On the Interaction between Severe Storms and Large Cumulus Clouds". Severe Local Storms. Vol. 5. Boston, Massachusetts: American Meteorological Society. pp. 59–64. doi:10.1007/978-1-940033-56-3_3. ISBN 978-1-940033-56-3 – via Springer Link.
- Riehl, Herbert; Malkus, Joanne (January 1961). "Some Aspects of Hurricane Daisy, 1958". Tellus. 13 (2): 181–213. doi:10.3402/tellusa.v13i2.9495 – via Taylor & Francis Online.
- Montgomery, M. T.; Nicholls, M. E.; Cram, T. A.; Saunders, A. B. (January 2006). "A Vortical Hot Tower Route to Tropical Cyclogenesis". Journal of the Atmospheric Sciences. 63 (1). Boston, Massachusetts: American Meteorological Society: 355–386. Bibcode:2006JAtS...63..355M. doi:10.1175/JAS3604.1. hdl:10945/36928. S2CID 20645674.
- Tao, Cheng; Jiang, Haiyan (February 2013). "Global Distribution of Hot Towers in Tropical Cyclones Based on 11-Yr TRMM Data". Journal of Climate. 26 (4). Boston, Massachusetts: American Meteorological Society: 1371–1386. Bibcode:2013JCli...26.1371T. doi:10.1175/JCLI-D-12-00291.1.
- Williams, E. R.; Geotis, S. G.; Renno, N.; Rutledge, S. A.; Rasmussen, E.; Rickenbach, T. (August 1992). "A Radar and Electrical Study of Tropical "Hot Towers"". Journal of the Atmospheric Sciences. 49 (15). Boston, Massachusetts: American Meteorological Society: 1386–1395. Bibcode:1992JAtS...49.1386W. doi:10.1175/1520-0469(1992)049<1386:ARAESO>2.0.CO;2.
- Zhuge, Xiao-Yong; Ming, Jie; Wang, Yuan (October 2015). "Reassessing the Use of Inner-Core Hot Towers to Predict Tropical Cyclone Rapid Intensification*". Weather and Forecasting. 30 (5). Boston, Massachusetts: American Meteorological Society: 1265–1279. Bibcode:2015WtFor..30.1265Z. doi:10.1175/WAF-D-15-0024.1.
- Zipser, Edward J. (2003). "Some Views on "Hot Towers" after 50 Years of Tropical Field Programs and Two Years of TRMM Data". In Tao, Wei-Kuo; Adler, Robert (eds.). Cloud Systems, Hurricanes, and the Tropical Rainfall Measuring Mission (TRMM). Boston, Massachusetts: American Meteorological Society. pp. 49–58. doi:10.1007/978-1-878220-63-9_5. ISBN 978-1-878220-63-9 – via Springer Link.
