= Robert Simpson (meteorologist) =

American meteorologist

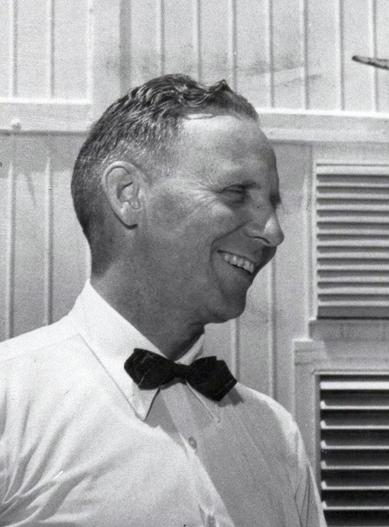
- Simpson in 1956
- Born: Robert H. Simpson; November 19, 1912; Corpus Christi, Texas, U.S.
- Died: December 18, 2014 (aged 102); Washington, D.C., U.S.
- Education: Southwestern University (B.S., 1933); Emory University (M.S., 1935); University of Chicago (Ph.D., 1962)
- Known for: Tropical cyclone research, Saffir–Simpson Hurricane Scale, NHC director
- Spouse: Joanne Simpson
- Awards: Department of Commerce Gold Medal, Cleveland Abbe Award
- Scientific career
- Fields: Meteorology
- Workplaces: Director of the National Hurricane Research Project; Director of the National Hurricane Center
- Theses: A Study of Piezo-electricity (1935); Analysis of a Large Scale Atmospheric Disturbance in the Lower Mesosphere (1962)
- Doctoral advisor: Herbert Riehl
- Other academic advisors: W. S. Nelms

Robert H. Simpson (November 19, 1912 – December 18, 2014) was an American meteorologist, hurricane specialist, first director of the National Hurricane Research Project (NHRP) from 1955 to 1959, and a former director (1967–1974) of the National Hurricane Center (NHC). He was the co-developer of the Saffir–Simpson Hurricane Scale with Herbert Saffir. His wife was Joanne Simpson.

== Early life ==
Simpson was born in Corpus Christi, Texas, on November 19, 1912, to Clyde Simpson, a ranching equipment merchant, and Annie Laurie Simpson (née Rainey), a pianist. He survived the devastating landfall of the 1919 Florida Keys hurricane at age six; one of his family members drowned. Simpson graduated with honors from Corpus Christi High School in 1929. He initially pursued a career in architecture and briefly worked as an apprentice architect for a housing developer in San Antonio, but the onset of the Great Depression soon brought an end to that pursuit. Fascinated by the weather, he went on to get a Bachelor of Science degree in physics from Southwestern University in 1933, and a Master of Science degree in physics from Emory University in 1935. Finding no work as a physicist during the Great Depression, he taught music in Texas high schools.

== Early career ==
On April 16, 1940, he was hired by the United States Weather Bureau. First assigned as a junior observer of meteorology at Brownsville, Texas, he was then temporarily assigned to Swan Island. After the Pearl Harbor attack, he was promoted to forecaster at the New Orleans Weather Bureau office. As part of a United States Weather Bureau scholarship, he did graduate work at the University of Chicago in 1943 and 1944. After a stint as a hurricane forecaster in Miami under Grady Norton, he was assigned to help create the Army Air Force weather school in Panama. There he had his first flight into a tropical cyclone. After the war, he persuaded Air Force Hurricane Hunters to allow him to fly along on what he called 'piggy back missions', where he would take scientific observations using the primitive instruments.

Following V-J Day and the dissolution of the weather school, Simpson returned to Miami. He was then assigned to Weather Bureau headquarters in Washington, D.C., working directly for Dr. Francis Reichelderfer. In 1949 Reichelderfer assigned Simpson to Hawaii to be in charge of consolidating the Weather Bureau's Pacific operations. There he founded a weather observation station on Mauna Loa, studied Kona lows, and flew a research mission into Typhoon Marge aboard a specifically equipped Air Force weather plane. He continually urged Weather Bureau management to fund modest levels of hurricane research, but budgets during the early 1950s didn't allow this. Then the devastating 1954 Atlantic hurricane season changed the minds of several New England congressmen, and a special appropriation was passed to improve the Weather Bureau's hurricane warning system. Reichelderfer appointed Simpson to head up the National Hurricane Research Project (NHRP) in 1955.

== Late career ==
For the next four years, Simpson navigated NHRP through the shoals of bureaucratic uncertainty. Once NHRP was assured longevity in 1959, Simpson left the project to finish his doctorate in meteorology at the University of Chicago, studying under his friend Dr. Herbert Riehl. On completing his degree in 1962, he returned to Washington to become the Weather Bureau's Deputy Director of Research (Severe Storms), where he helped establish the National Severe Storms Project (later to become the National Severe Storms Laboratory). In 1961 he obtained a National Science Foundation grant to study seeding hurricanes with silver iodide. He put together an experiment using NHRP and United States Navy aircraft to seed Hurricane Esther. The encouraging results led the Weather Bureau and the Navy to start Project Stormfury in 1962, with Simpson as director. He headed up the project for the next three years, including the seeding of Hurricane Beulah in 1963. He married Joanne Malkus in 1965 and persuaded her to take over as director of Stormfury for the next two years as he became director of operations for the Weather Bureau.

In 1967, Simpson became deputy director of the National Hurricane Center. Simpson reorganized NHC, making it separate from the Miami Weather Bureau office, and established the position of 'hurricane specialist' for NHC's senior forecasters. He directed NHC from 1968 to 1974, during which time he co-developed the Saffir-Simpson Hurricane Scale (SSHS) with Herbert Saffir, established a dedicated satellite unit at NHC, studied neutercanes, and began issuing advisories on subtropical storms. His controversial remarks to Vice President Spiro Agnew in the wake of Hurricane Camille led to an upgrade of the Air Force and Navy Hurricane Hunter squadrons, and persuaded ESSA (the predecessor of NOAA) to improve its hurricane research aircraft.

== Retirement ==
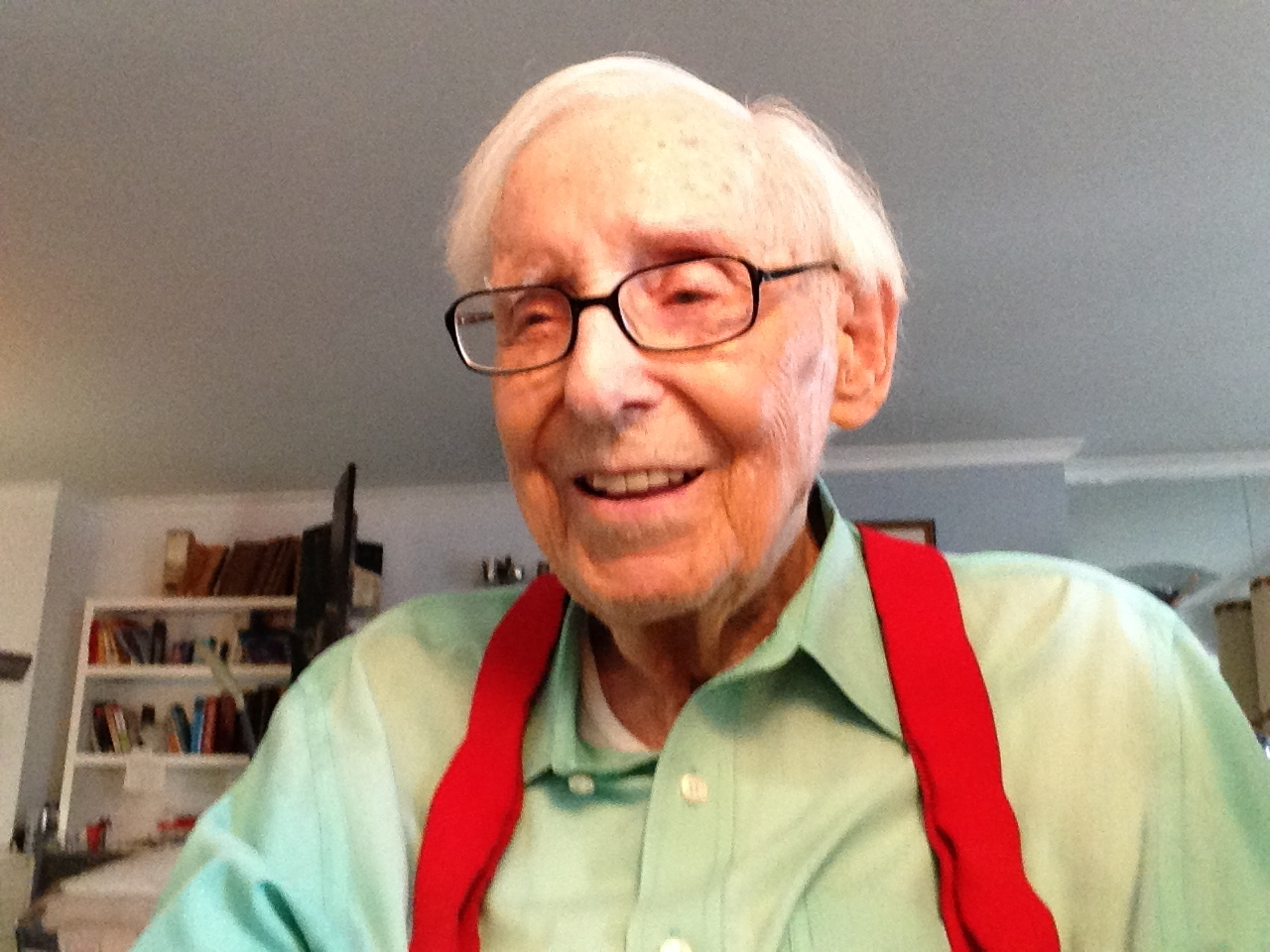
Simpson in 2013 at the age of 101.

Simpson retired from government service in 1974, turning NHC over to his Deputy Director Neil Frank. He returned to Washington with Joanne, where they established a weather consulting firm, Simpson Weather Associates in Charlottesville, Virginia. At this time he became a Certified Consulting Meteorologist. Both he and Joanne joined the faculty of the University of Virginia in the Environmental Sciences Department. In that capacity, he participated in several international scientific experiments, including the GARP Atlantic Tropical Experiment (GATE), the Monsoon Experiment (MONEX), the Island Tropical Experiment (ITEX), and TOGA Coupled Ocean Atmosphere Response Experiment (COARE). He co-authored the book The Hurricane and Its Impacts with Herbert Riehl, and recently was senior editor and contributing author to HURRICANE! Coping with Disaster.

== Honors and awards ==
Simpson was an Honorary Member of the American Meteorological Society (AMS) and a Fellow of the Explorers Club of New York. He was the recipient of gold medals from both the U.S. and France, and of the Cleveland Abbe Award from the AMS.

== Later years and death ==
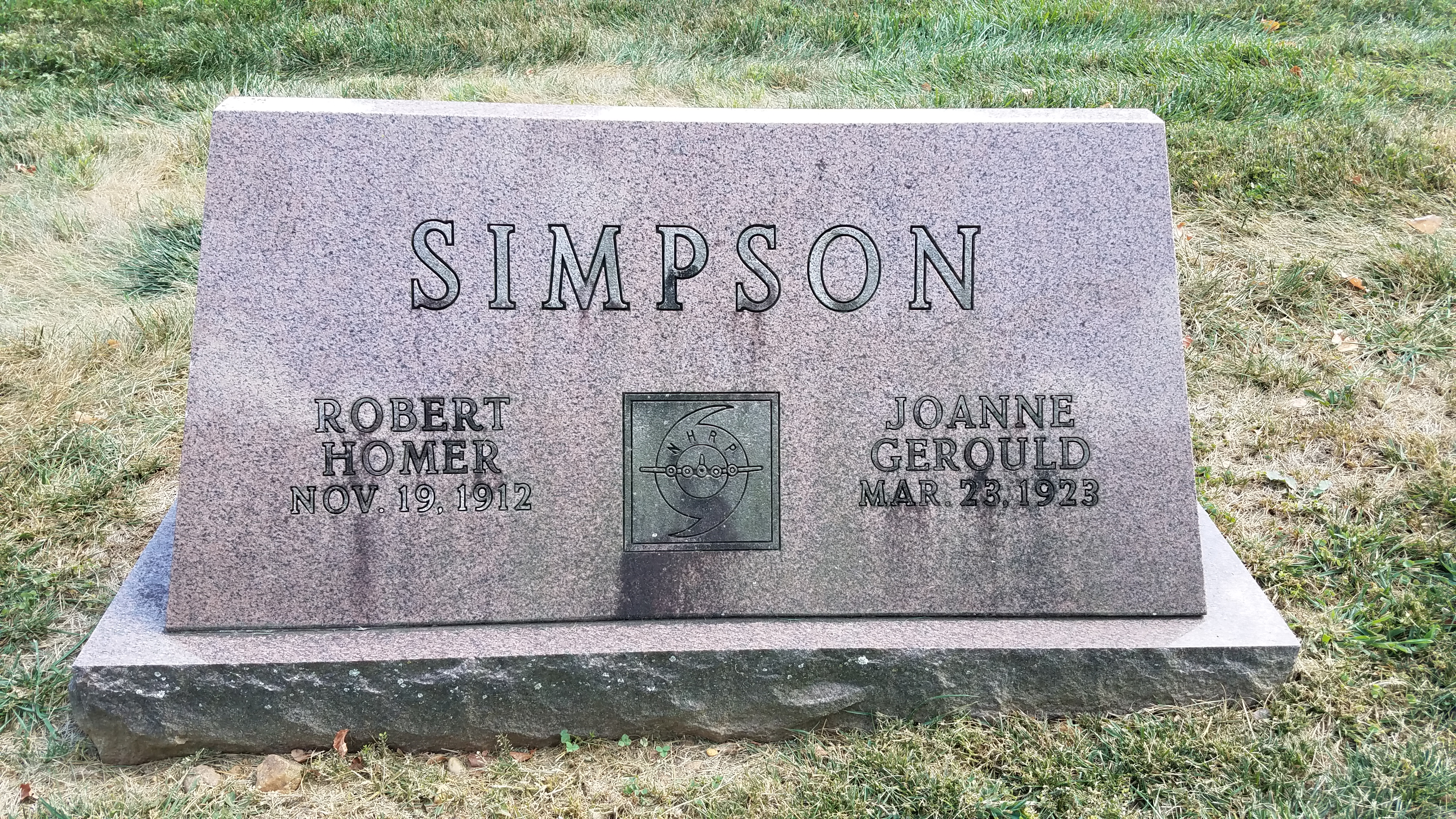
The headstone of Robert and Joanne Simpson in Rock Creek Cemetery in Washington, D.C.

Simpson, who turned 100 in 2012, resided in Washington, D.C., until his death at the age of 102 following a stroke on December 18, 2014. He is interred, along with his wife Joanne (who died in 2010), in Rock Creek Cemetery in Washington, D.C. Their shared headstone features an engraving of the NHRP logo. A February 19, 2015, memorial service held in Simpson's honor featured AMS past presidents Louis Uccellini (also a former National Weather Service director) and Richard Anthes, as well as meteorologist Greg Holland of the National Center for Atmospheric Research (NCAR).

== Bibliography ==
- Robert Simpson, "Structure of an Immature Hurricane," Bulletin of the American Meteorological Society Vol. 35 No. 8 (October 1954): 335–350.
- Robert Simpson, "Hurricanes," Scientific American (1954): 32–37.
- Robert Simpson, "Liquid Water in Squall Lines and Hurricanes at air temperatures lower than −40°C," Mon. Wea. Rev. (1963): v.91 687–693.
- Robert Simpson and Joanne Malkus, "Why Experiment on Tropical Hurricanes?," Trans. NY Acad of Sci (1966): v.28 n.8.
- Robert Simpson and Neal Dorst, Hurricane Pioneer: Memoirs of Bob Simpson (2014), Boston: American Meteorological Society. ISBN 978-1-935704-75-1

Preceded by Gordon Dunn	Director of the National Hurricane Center; 1967–1974	Succeeded by Neil Frank
