= Cold pool =

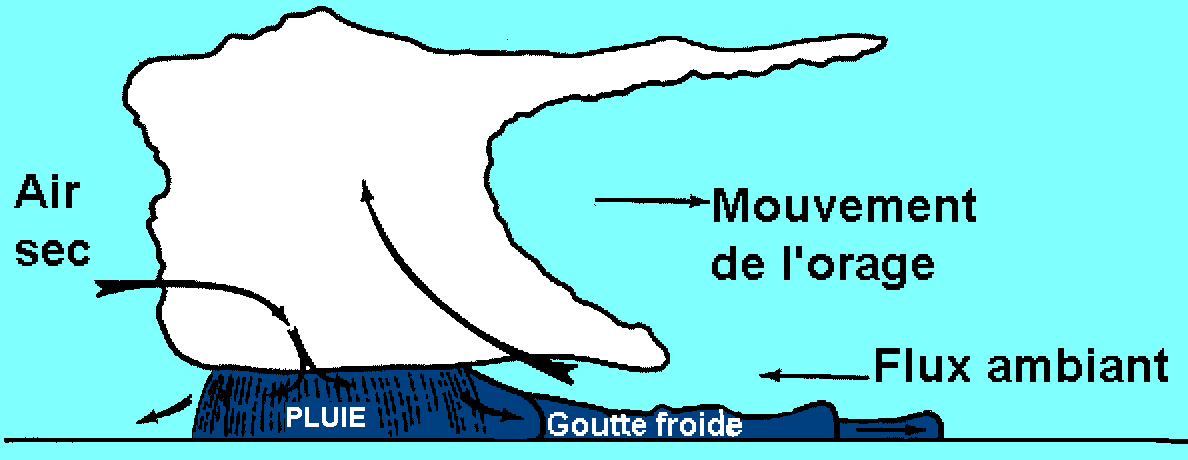
Cold pool forming and expanding under a thunderstorm.

In atmospheric science, a cold pool (CP) is a cold pocket of dense air that forms when rain evaporates during intense precipitation e.g. underneath a thunderstorm cloud or a precipitating shallow cloud. Typically, cold pools spread at 10 m/s and last 2–3 hours. Cold pools are ubiquitous both over land and ocean.

The characteristics and impact of cold pools vary depending on the properties of the parent convection, namely its rain rates, and the large-scale environment in which they originate. Cold pools can have a strong impact on cloud cover and organization, by triggering new convection at the gust front and suppressing clouds in its interior.

Cold pools can be detected and studied using observations, high resolution numerical simulations, and simple conceptual models.

== Characteristics ==
Cold pools spread radially away from the rain event along the surface as a moving gust front. When the gust front passes, cold pools cause an increase in wind speed and a sudden drop in specific humidity and in air temperature. In large-eddy simulations, they reach 10 km in radius, whereas, in reality, they can become as large as 50–100 km in radius and last 2-3 h on average.

== Cold pool properties, formation, and recovery ==
Radar loop showing the leading edge of the gust front (light blue) created by the cold pool spreading from a thunderstorm (left).

Cold pools consist of a large-scale mass of cold air surrounded by warmer air (according to the American Meteorological Society). Over the ocean, these masses of cold and dense surface air are mostly caused by cooling through evaporation of precipitation from shallow and thunderstorm clouds in unsaturated air. Evaporation of precipitation requires energy, which is used in the form of latent heat, making the air inside a cold pool denser than the environmental air. In addition, the falling rain drags the air around it. These effects accelerate the air mass towards the surface, leading to a rapid decrease in surface air temperature and generating a divergent flow that moves radially away from the location of the precipitation. As the density current spreads horizontally outward, dry and cold air is injected into the boundary layer due to the penetrative downdrafts. This dries the central area of the cold pool, sometimes referred to as the cold pool wake, more than the edges. Cold pools spread radially away from the rain event along the surface as a moving gust front. When the gust front passes, cold pools cause an increase in wind speed and a sudden drop in specific humidity and in air temperature. The gust front is associated with wind enhancement and mechanical lifting of moist air. The cold pool gust front can therefore usually be identified as a mesoscale cloud arc.

Cold pools end when their features can no longer be distinguished from the large-scale flow, i.e., when their signature in meteorological variables is within the background variability of the environment. The temperature in the interior of a cold pool usually recovers faster than the temperature at the edge, since air from above the boundary layer is entrained into the cold pool wake. Additionally, the moisture recovers much more quickly than the temperature.

== Cold pools in different regimes ==
Cold pools are ubiquitous both over land and ocean. Nearly all shallow clouds in the trade-wind region that produce precipitation rates larger than 1 mm/h are associated with cold pools.

Cold pool characteristics differ depending on the depth of the parent convection (deep or shallow). The properties of cold pools formed in the trades (characterized by shallow convection) were observed to vary significantly from properties of cold pools formed from tropical deep convection. For example, they are associated with temperature drops that are on average 2 K weaker, and they experience less drying and smaller wind speed enhancement. The trade wind region is mainly drier and is characterized by subsiding motion that caps the growth of convection and maintains clouds shallow.

== Triggering convection ==
Cold pools are found to trigger secondary convection at their edges, through the combination of mechanical and thermodynamic lifting. Thermodynamic convective triggering is due to enhanced water vapor and virtual temperature in the gust front; it is prevalent in regions of deep convection with low vertical shear over the ocean. Mechanical convective triggering also occurs at the cold pool edges when the spreading velocity is high enough. Collisions between multiple cold pools can trigger the formation of a new thunderstorm event, and thereby form a new cold pool.

Over land the effect of aerosols and surface fluxes are of high importance for the triggering of new convection.

== Convective and cloud organization ==
An important role of cold pools can be found in the evolution of convective aggregation. Cold pools tend to homogenize the convection and moisture fields through the divergence of near-surface air, and can therefore act to oppose convective self-aggregation. This can be the case for deep and shallow convection. Cold pools have been pointed to as the source of the domain-dependence of cloud resolving models to initiate convective self-aggregation. Convective self-aggregation can only occur at domains larger than ~200km. In larger domains, cold pools would dissipate before they could travel far enough to inhibit aggregation of convection. There is a competition between the homogenizing effect of cold pools and the inflow of moisture from the dry regions into a convectively aggregated cell, which is thought to contribute to edge-intensified convection.

It has been shown that specific mesoscale cloud organization patterns in the trade-wind region are associated with different occurrence frequencies and properties of cold pools. This is due to the different environmental conditions, as well as rain and cloud properties, associated with different patterns. It is not yet clear how important cold pools are for maintaining or initiating patterns. Cold pools may also aid in the transition from shallow to deep convection.

== Cloud cover ==
Cold pools are expected to have an influence on the cloud cover through their effects on both triggering and suppressing cloudiness. However, this is still an open topic of research. In the trade wind region, this is especially important because the cloud cover greatly contributes to the planetary albedo. Challenges in representing and observing microphysical processes, wind shear effects, and the recovery of cold pools, hinder the understanding of the relationship between cold pools and cloud cover.

== Observations ==
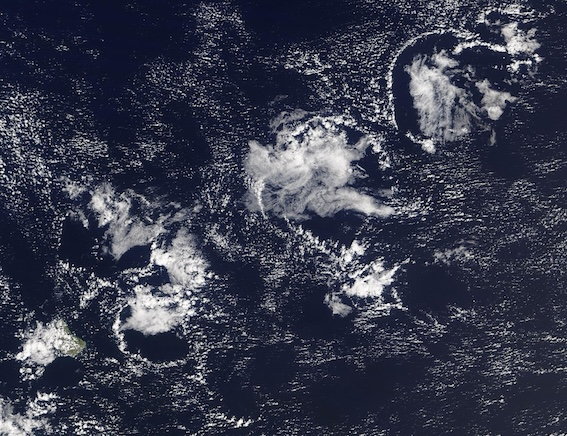
Snapshot from NASA's Terra/MODIS of cold pools in the vicinity of Barbados, on February 5th, 2020.

From satellite images, cold pools can be identified as mesoscale arcs of clouds surrounding clear-sky areas or stratiform decks. Common detection methods rely on measurements of strong and abrupt surface temperature drops or the onset of strong rain rates. Cold pools can also be identified from changes in the depth of the atmospheric mixed layer, or from synthetic aperture radar images.

Cold pools have been studied from observations taken during several field campaigns. For example during the Rain in Cumulus over the Ocean campaign (RICO) in the eastern Caribbean between December 2004 and January 2005, during the Dynamics of the Madden–Julian Oscillation experiment (DYNAMO) in the Indian Ocean, from the Barbados Cloud Observatory over 12 years and during EUREC4A, and from dense station networks (FESSTVaL, FESST@HH), to name some examples.

== Modeling ==
Cold pools have been studied using Large Eddy Simulations and Cloud Resolving Models over smaller domains. Models reproduce the water vapor rings seen in observations, but may overestimate the moisture content of these rings. Difficulties in modeling cold pools arise in the representation of turbulent mixing and microphysics, which occur at the very small scales. The boundary conditions at the edges of the model domain must also be considered and impact the properties of simulated cold pools.

== See also ==
- Cold drop
