= Joanne Simpson =

American meteorologist (1923–2010)

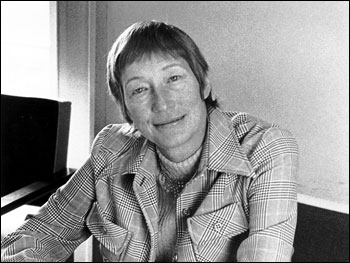
- Simpson in the 1970s
- Born: Joanne Gerould; March 23, 1923; Boston, Massachusetts, U.S.
- Died: March 4, 2010 (aged 86); Washington, D.C., U.S.
- Resting place: Rock Creek Cemetery
- Known for: Tropical meteorology and tropical cyclone research
- Spouses: Victor P. Starr (m. 1944; div. 1947) Willem Malkus (m. 1948; div. 1964) Robert Simpson (m. 1965)
- Children: 3
- Awards: Carl-Gustaf Rossby Research Medal
- Scientific career
- Fields: Meteorology
- Thesis: Certain Features of Undisturbed and Disturbed Weather in the Trade-Wind Region (1949)
- Doctoral advisor: Herbert Riehl

Joanne Simpson (formerly Joanne Malkus, born Joanne Gerould; March 23, 1923 – March 4, 2010) was the first woman in the United States to receive a Ph.D. in meteorology, which she received in 1949 from the University of Chicago. Simpson received both her undergraduate and graduate degrees from the University of Chicago, and did post-doctoral work at Dartmouth College. She was a member of the National Academy of Engineering, and taught and researched meteorology at numerous universities as well as the federal government. Simpson contributed to many areas of the atmospheric sciences, particularly in the field of tropical meteorology. She has researched hot towers, hurricanes, the trade winds, air-sea interactions, and helped develop the Tropical Rainfall Measuring Mission (TRMM).

== Academic life ==
Simpson's teaching and research career at universities includes time at the University of Chicago, New York University, Illinois Institute of Technology, Woods Hole Oceanographic Institution, UCLA, the Environmental Satellite Services Administration (ESSA), the National Oceanic and Atmospheric Administration (NOAA), University of Virginia, and the National Aeronautics and Space Administration (NASA).

== Research ==
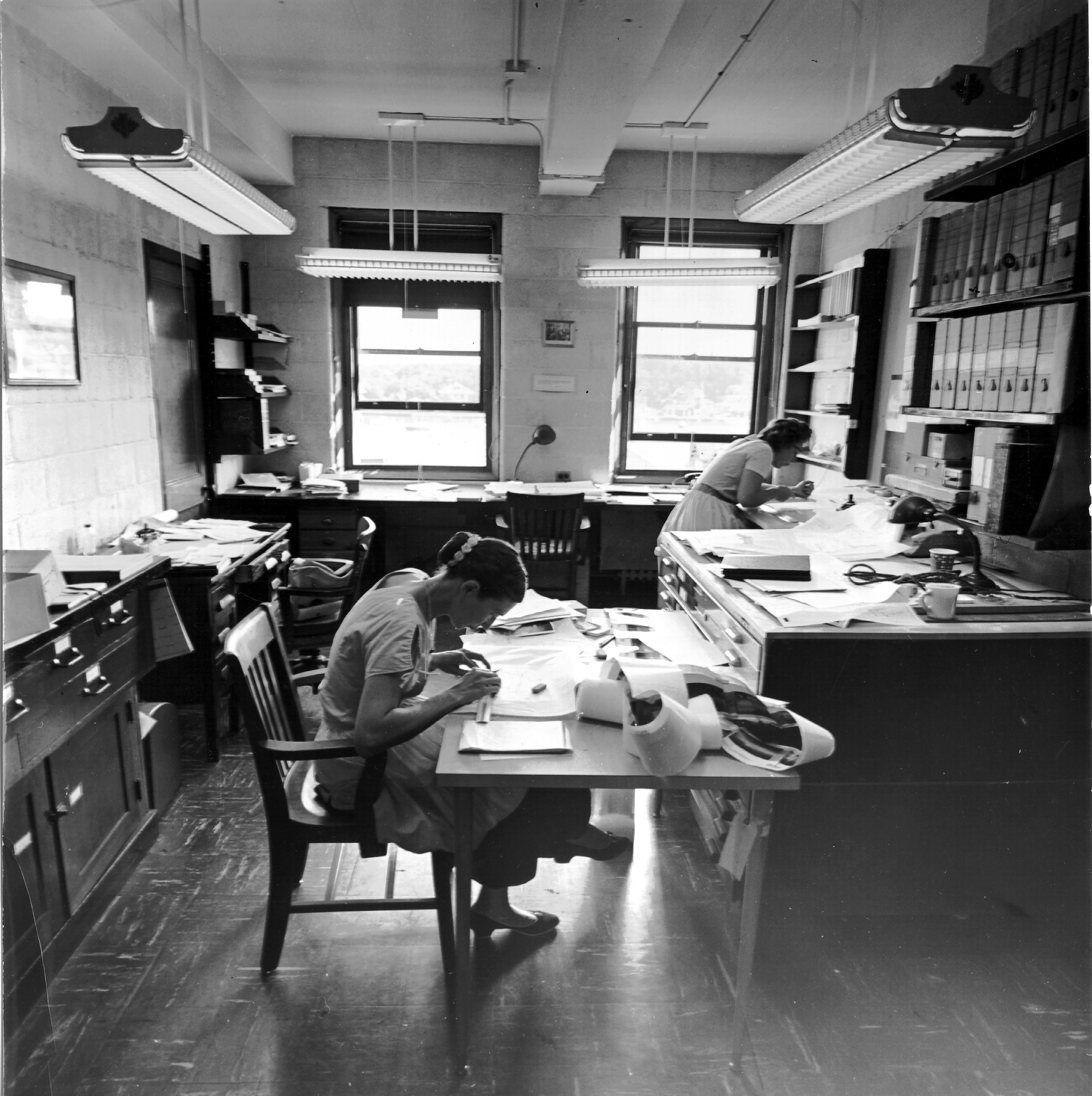
Simpson bent over reams of images of clouds that she filmed during long flights between islands in the tropical Pacific.

In 1958, Simpson (then Malkus) collaborated with Herbert Riehl and calculated the average moist static energy and how it varied vertically throughout the atmosphere. They noted that at altitudes up to approximately 750 hPa the moist static energy decreased with height. Above 750 hPa, the moist static energy increased with height which had neither been observed or explained before. The pair realized this must be due to moist convection that started near the surface that continued rising relatively adiabatically to near 50,000 feet (15,000 m). They called these clouds "undiluted chimneys" but they would later be commonly referred to as hot towers. They estimated that it would take less than 5,000 of these towers daily throughout the tropics to result in the moist static energy profile they observed.

By 1966, Simpson became the director of Project Stormfury while chief of the Experimental Meteorology Branch of the Environment Satellite Services Administration's Institute for Atmospheric Sciences. She eventually became NASA's lead weather researcher and authored or co-authored over 190 articles.

== Honors and awards ==
- 1954 Received the Guggenheim Fellowship
- 1962 Melsinger Award from the American Meteorological Society (AMS)
- 1963 Selected by the Los Angeles Times as "Woman of the Year" in Science.
- 1967 Won a Department of Commerce Silver Medal for her work with the Experimental Meteorology Branch.
- 1968 Elected a fellow of the AMS.
- 1974 Designated a Certified Consulting Meteorologist (CCM, #139) by the AMS.
- 1975 Recipient of Professional Achievement Award of the University of Chicago Alumni Association
- 1983 Recipient of the AMS's Carl-Gustaf Rossby Research Medal, its highest honor, for "outstanding contributions to man's understanding of the structure of the atmosphere."
- 1989 Became the first woman to serve as president of the AMS.
- 2002 Awarded the prestigious International Meteorological Organization Prize from the World Meteorological Organization.
- 2021 AMS established the Joanne Simpson Tropical Meteorology Research Award granted to researchers who make outstanding contributions to advancing the understanding of the physics and dynamics of the tropical atmosphere. The inaugural recipient was Kerry H. Cook.

== Personal ==
Simpson was married three times. In 1944, she married meteorologist Victor Starr; the two divorced in 1947. In 1948, she married her second husband, physics instructor Willem Van Rensselaer Malkus, who would go on to be a professor of applied mathematics at MIT. She and Malkus divorced in 1964 and, in January 1965, she married meteorologist Robert Simpson, whom she first met in 1943 and with whom she already had a professional relationship.

Simpson is quoted as saying winning the Rossby Medal in 1983 made her feel "it isn't really so ridiculous that I did all of this. I'm not really a freak; I am a member of the community."

Yet, poignantly, in an article published in the Annals of the New York Academy of Sciences, she was quoted as saying, "I am not convinced that either the position, rewards or achievements have been worth the cost. My personal and married life and child raising have surely suffered from the professional attainments I have achieved."

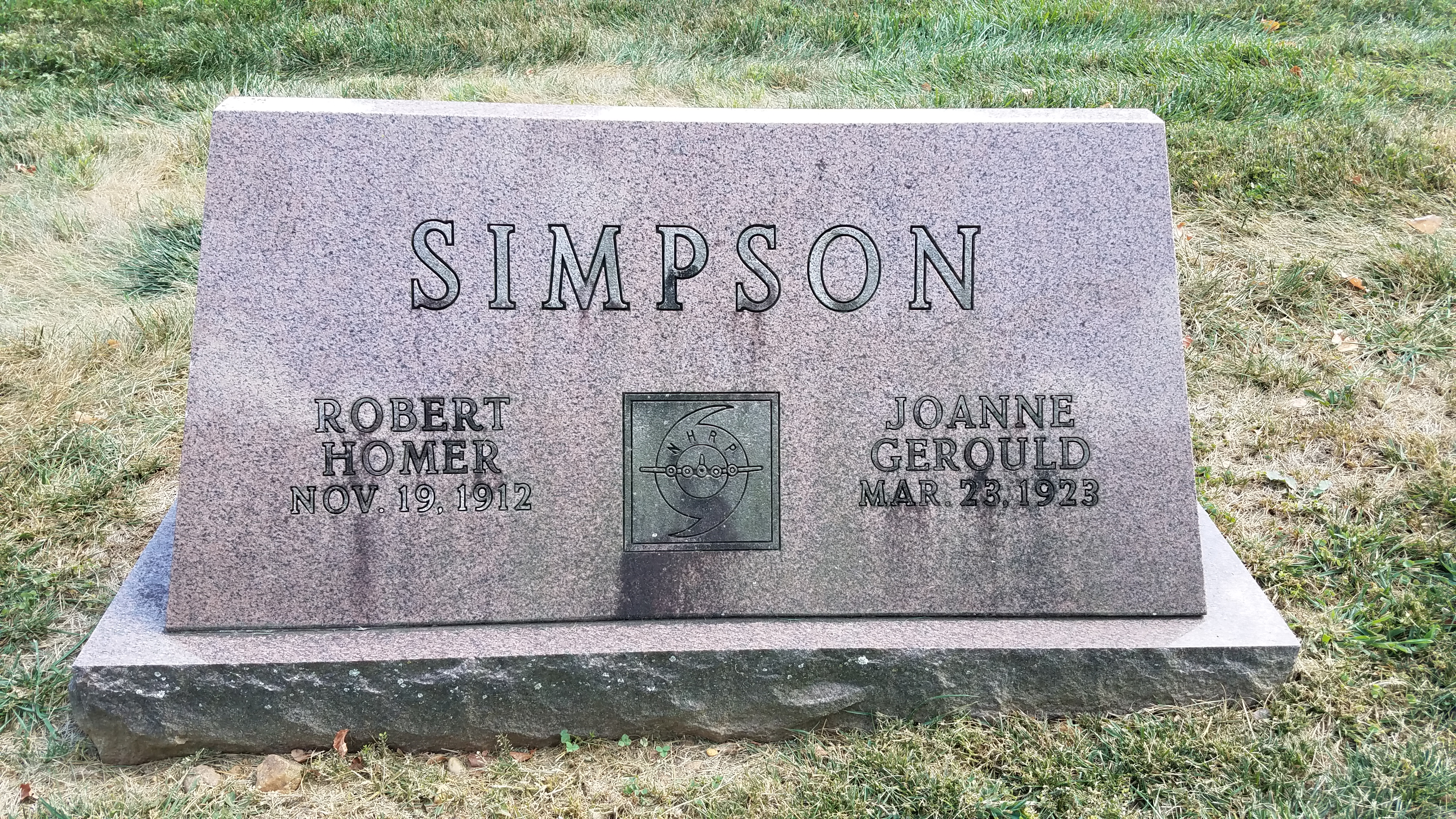
Headstone of Joanne and Robert Simpson in Rock Creek Cemetery in Washington, D.C.

Her, brother Daniel C. Gerould, was the Lucille Lortel Distinguished Professor of Theatre and Comparative Literature at the Graduate Center, City University of New York and Director of Publications of the Martin E. Segal Theatre Center.

Simpson died March 4, 2010, in Washington D.C., at the age of 86 from multiple organ failure. She is buried, along with her husband Robert, at Rock Creek Cemetery in Washington, D.C.
