= Equivalent temperature =

Temperature of an air parcel drained from its moisture by adiabatic process

In atmospheric science, equivalent temperature is the temperature of air in a parcel from which all the water vapor has been extracted by an adiabatic process.

Air contains water vapor that has been evaporated into it from liquid sources (lakes, sea, etc...). The energy needed to do that has been taken from the air. Taking a volume of air at temperature T and mixing ratio of r, drying it by condensation will restore energy to the airmass. This will depend on the latent heat release as:
$$T_e \approx T + \frac{L_v}{c_{pd}} r$$
where:

- $L_v$ : latent heat of evaporation (2400 kJ/kg at 25°C to 2600 kJ/kg at −40°C)
- $c_{pd}$ : specific heat at constant pressure for air (≈ 1004 J/(kg·K))

Tables exist for exact values of the last two coefficients.

== See also ==
- Wet-bulb temperature
- Potential temperature
- Atmospheric thermodynamics
- Equivalent potential temperature

== Bibliography ==
- M Robitzsch, Aequivalenttemperatur und Aequivalentthemometer, Meteorologische Zeitschrift, 1928, pp. 313-315.
- M K Yau and R.R. Rogers, Short Course in Cloud Physics, Third Edition, published by Butterworth-Heinemann, January 1, 1989, 304 pages. ISBN 9780750632157 ISBN 0-7506-3215-1
- J.V. Iribarne and W.L. Godson, Atmospheric Thermodynamics, published by D. Reidel Publishing Company, Dordrecht, Holland, 1973, 222 pages
