= Herbert Saffir =

American scientist (1917–2007)

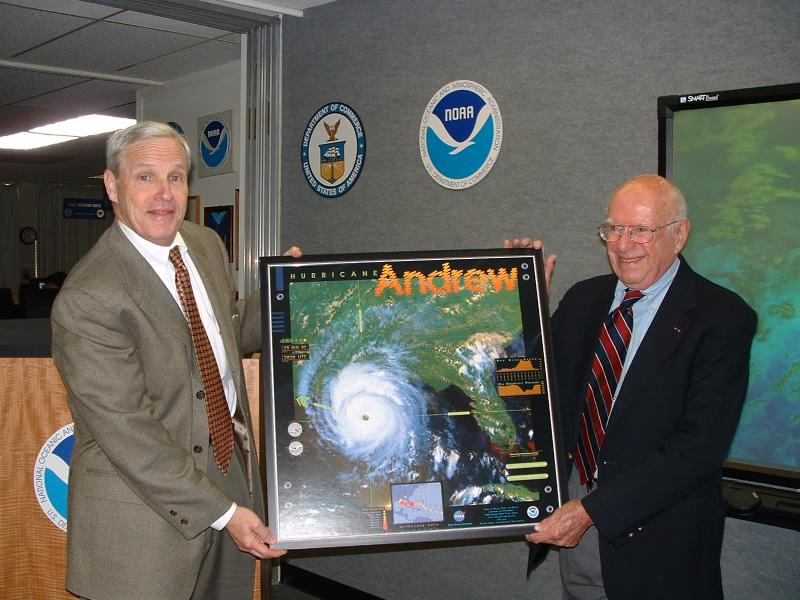
- NWS Director Jack Kelly presents Herbert Saffir (on right) with a framed poster of Hurricane Andrew depicting the Saffir–Simpson scale
- Born: March 29, 1917; Brooklyn, New York City, United States
- Died: November 21, 2007 (aged 90); Miami, Florida
- Education: Georgia Institute of Technology
- Known for: Saffir–Simpson scale
- Scientific career
- Fields: Civil engineering

Herbert Seymour Saffir (March 29, 1917 – November 21, 2007) (/ˈsæfər/) was an American civil engineer who co-developed (with meteorologist Robert Simpson) the Saffir–Simpson Hurricane Scale for measuring the intensity of hurricanes. As recently as 2005 Saffir was the principal of Saffir Engineering in Coral Gables, Florida. He also published articles on designing buildings for high wind resistance.

== Education and early career ==
Originally from Brooklyn, Saffir graduated from the Georgia Institute of Technology in 1940 with a B.S. in civil engineering. Saffir worked for Dade County, Florida beginning in 1947 as an assistant county engineer, and worked on updating the county building code. Since that time, he had traveled extensively to study windstorm damage for clues to improvements and has been a tireless advocate for stricter codes in hurricane-prone areas.

== Later career ==
In 1965 Saffir was working on a study of windstorm damage on low-cost housing commissioned by the United Nations (UN), Saffir developed a scale to categorize the intensity of hurricanes by their maximum wind speed. In 1969, his friend Bob Simpson, then-director of the National Hurricane Center (NHC), added information on the potential storm surge and range of central pressures for each category, resulting in what later became known as the Saffir–Simpson Hurricane Scale.

Saffir survived the burning of the ocean liner SS Morro Castle on September 8, 1934. The ship was en route from Havana to New York when it caught fire and burned, killing a total of 137 passengers and crew members.

On November 21, 2007 Herbert Saffir died of a heart attack at South Miami Hospital in Miami according to his son, Richard Saffir. He was 90 years old.

== See also ==
- Hurricane engineering
- Structural engineering
- Wind engineering
