= National Hurricane Research Laboratory =

The National Hurricane Research Laboratory (NHRL) is the hurricane research arm of the National Oceanic and Atmospheric Administration. It was formed in December 1964 out of the National Hurricane Research Project, the U. S. Weather Bureau's effort to scientifically examine tropical cyclones in order to make better predictions. Laboratory status signified that this effort was now a permanent part of the Weather Bureau's activities.

== History ==
Director R. Cecil Gentry supervised the move of NHRL from the Aviation Building near Miami International Airport, to the newly built Computer Center building on the University of Miami's Coral Gables campus in January 1965. They were accompanied by the Miami hurricane forecast office, and the two combined entities were known, at that time, as the National Hurricane Center (NHC). The 1965 hurricane field program centered on researching Hurricane Betsy. Project STORMFURY made plans to seed Betsy to examine hurricane modification methods, but Betsy turned before entering the operational area, so instead NHRL carried out a 'dry run', in which no silver iodide was released. Confusion in communicating this change in plans to the press resulted in some people believing Betsy was seeded and that its subsequent track changes were a result of that.

No further seeding opportunities presented themselves over the next five years, so NHRL scientists concentrated on examining hurricanes in their unmodified states. Notable hurricanes that they flew experiments in include Hurricane Inez (1966), Hurricane Beulah (1967), and Hurricane Gladys (1968). They also improved on their hurricane track forecast models such as NHC-67 and SANBAR, a barotropic model developed in conjunction with Dr. Fred Sanders (MIT). They refined their models of storm circulation, and used these improved versions to test STORMFURY theories. In addition to their earlier projects, they participated in international weather research projects such as BOMEX (1969). In 1967, the 'NHC' name was claimed solely by the Miami hurricane forecast office.

Another seeding opportunity availed itself in August 1969, when Hurricane Debbie moved into their operational area. They carried out several seedings over two days. While they were busy in Puerto Rico, Hurricane Camille rapidly intensified and struck the Gulf coast. The outfall from that devastating storm prompted improvements in the reconnaissance fleets. NHRL carried out another seeding experiment on Hurricane Ginger (1971), but it was a weak, disorganized system, and little change was noted.

Hurricane activity in the Atlantic became decidedly slower in the 1970s, and NHRL managers tried to move STORMFURY to the Pacific. That proved politically unfeasible, and the Navy and Air Force withdrew from Project STORMFURY. NHRL turned more to theoretical studies and sought improvements to its computer models. They also participated in GATE, a massive international weather experiment held off the west coast of Africa, examining disturbances which could form into hurricanes.

In 1975, the Experimental Meteorology Laboratory was enfolded into NHRL and it became known as the National Hurricane and Experimental Meteorology Laboratory (NHEML) for the next six years. NHEML engaged in several cloud modification studies as hurricane activity remained low. NHEML gained access to new Orion P-3 aircraft in 1975 and 1976 to replace the DC-6s. The new airframes also had better instrumentation, including digitized radars and cloud physics probes.

NHC and NHEML were moved from their University of Miami perch in 1978 to a nearby commercial office building. This move proved disruptive, as some archive material was lost and caused some long-time staff members to retire or resign; however, the better quality data from the P-3s was analyzed by a new generation of researchers, hired to replace those who left after the move. This resulted in improved understanding of hurricane dynamics, leading to the formulation of the eyewall replacement cycle.

With the decline in enthusiasm for weather modification and the end of Project STORMFURY in 1983, a portion of the Experimental Meteorology scientists were transferred out of the NHEML to the former Environmental Research Laboratory in Boulder, Colorado, with the remaining organization once again resuming the title of NHRL. In 1984, NHRL was renamed the Hurricane Research Division, or HRD, of the Atlantic Oceanographic and Meteorological Laboratory, or AOML. This meant moving the hurricane researchers from their offices co-located with the NHC out to NOAA's AOML facility, located on Virginia Key, a barrier island located between downtown Miami and Key Biscayne.

In August, 1992, the facility sustained moderate damage after the passage of Hurricane Andrew, however, despite significant personal disruption of their own lives, reconnaissance flights continued into Andrew until it made a final landfall along the Louisiana coastline several days later.

During the 1990s the HRD staff continued to refine its forecasting models, and despite the retirement or transfer of several long-time key research staff members, made numerous research flights into a number of notable hurricanes of that decade, including Hurricane Opal (1995) and Hurricane Georges (1998).

During the disastrous 2005 hurricane season, the organization flew ongoing missions into infamous Hurricane Katrina, which provided invaluable data that continues to be studied at their Miami facility.
