= Daniel C. Gerould =

American dramatist

Daniel Charles Gerould (March 28, 1928 – February 13, 2012) was the Lucille Lortel Distinguished Professor of Theatre and Comparative Literature at the CUNY Graduate Center and Director of Publications of the Martin E. Segal Theatre Center. A scholar, teacher, translator, editor, and playwright, Gerould was a specialist in US melodrama, Central and Eastern European theatre of the twentieth century, and fin-de-siècle European avant-garde performance. Gerould was one of the world’s most recognized “Witkacologists,” a leading scholar and translator of the work of Polish playwright, novelist, painter, and philosopher Stanisław Ignacy Witkiewicz ("Witkacy"). Gerould was best known for introducing English-language audiences to the writings of Witkiewicz through such work as Stanisław I. Witkiewicz, The Beelzebub Sonata: Plays, Essays, Documents (PAJ Publications 1980), Witkacy: Stanisław Ignacy Witkiewicz as an Imaginative Writer (University of Washington Press, 1981), The Witkiewicz Reader (Northwestern University Press, 1992), and his original translations of most of Witkiewicz’s plays.

== Career ==
Gerould began his teaching career at the University of Arkansas (1949–1951) and earned a Diplôme in French Literature from the Sorbonne in 1955 and a PhD in Comparative Literature from the University of Chicago in 1959. Gerould taught at San Francisco State University from 1959 to 1968, where he founded the Department of World and Comparative Literature. In 1968, Gerould’s play Candaules Commissioner, an anti-war comedy informed by US military action in Vietnam and the Classical Greek allegory of King Candaules, premiered at the Stanford Repertory Theatre. He began teaching at the Graduate Center, CUNY in 1970.

In 1981, Gerould founded the Institute for Contemporary East European Drama and Theatre with Alma Law as part of the Center for Advanced Study in Theatre Arts at the City University of New York Graduate Center. Gerould and Law co-edited the Institute’s tri-annual publication, originally titled Newsnotes on Soviet and East European Drama and Theatre, later changed to Soviet and East European Performance, and finally Slavic and East European Performance.

From 2004 to 2008, Gerould served as executive director at the Martin E. Segal Theatre Center, The Graduate Center CUNY.

== Work ==
Gerould's writings often include personal description of historical figures to frame important theoretical texts, as seen in his collection Theatre/Theory/Theory.

Known for his "sometimes oddball attraction to little-known works by obscure artists," Gerould described being more interested in the “underrated than the overexposed and universally celebrated," noting Witkacy as "a case in point, having gone from controversial outsider to classic of the avant-garde in three decades.”

His translations in Polish received numerous awards, including the Witkacy Prize (1983) from the Polish Centre of the International Theatre Institute, Los Angeles Drama Critics Circle, Polish Authors Agency, Jurzykowski Foundation, American Association of Teachers of Slavic and East European Languages, American Council of Polish Cultural Clubs, and Marian Kister.

Gerould was also responsible for bringing new productions of many previously-forgotten or under-produced plays to New York and other U.S. stages. Gerould brought plays by Witkiewicz, including his translation of The Crazy Locomotive, produced at the Chelsea Theatre Center, directed by Des McAnuff and featuring Glenn Close and described in detail in Chelsea on the Edge.

Gerould was the recipient of the City University of New York Award for Excellence in Teaching (Graduate Center) and was honored by TWB, Theater Without Borders, as a Groundbreaker in international theatre exchanges.

== Personal life ==
Gerould was born in Cambridge in 1928. His father, a journalist from a New England whaling family, was of French Huguenot descent. In the 2010 introduction to his compendium of essays, QuickChange, Gerould described trips to the “legitimate stage” with his mother in the 1930s and early 40s as planting the seeds for his long career as an “intensive spectator”:

"At that time many Broadway-bound productions tried out first in Boston, and I remember Ethel Barrymore in The Corn Is Green by Emlyn Williams and Arsenic and Old Lace with Boris Karloff. I felt myself a seasoned spectator, was at home among audiences, and was always ready to applaud bravura displays of virtuoso acting."

Gerould graduated from Boston Latin High School and entered the University of Chicago at the age of 16. He later traveled to Paris as an exchange student in the 1954-55 season, further shaping his passion for the theatre and impassioned spectatorship.

Gerould was married to the Polish scholar and translator Jadwiga Kosicka, with whom he frequently collaborated. His older sister, Joanne Simpson, was the first woman to receive a Ph.D. in meteorology.

== Selected publications ==
- American Melodrama. Editor. (1982)
- Avant Garde Drama: A Casebook. Edited by Bernard F. Dukore and Daniel C. Gerould. (1976)
- Avant-Garde Drama: Major Plays and Documents, Post World War I. Edited and with an introduction by Bernard F. Dukore and Daniel C. Gerould. (1969)
- Comedy: a Bibliography of Critical Studies in English on the Theory and Practice of Comedy in Drama, Theatre, and Performance. Editor, Meghan Duffy; Senior Editor, Daniel Gerould; initiated by Stuart Baker, Michael Earley & David Nicholson. (2006)
- Country House. Stanisław Ignacy Witkiewicz. Translated and with an introduction by Daniel Gerould. (1997)
- Critical Reception of Shawʾs Plays in France: 1908-1950. Dissertation by Daniel Gerould. 1959.
- Doubles, Demons, and Dreamers: An International Collection of Symbolist Drama. Editor. (1983)
- Gallant and Libertine: Divertissements & Parades of 18th-Century France. Editor Daniel Gerould. (1983)
- Guillotine: Its Legend and Lore (1992)
- Life of Solitude: Stanisława Przybyszewska : a Biographical Study with Selected Letters. Jadwiga Kosicka and Daniel Gerould. (1989)
- Maciej Korbowa and Bellatrix. Stanisław Witkiewicz. Translated and introduced by Daniel Gerould. (2009)
- Maeterlinck Reader: Plays, Poems, Short Fiction, Aphorisms, and Essays. Maurice Maeterlinck. Edited & translated by David Willinger and Daniel Gerould.(2011)
- Melodrama. Daniel Gerould, Guest Editor; Jeanine Parisier Plottel, General Editor. (1980)
- Mother & Other Unsavory Plays: Including the Shoemakers and They. Stanisław Ignacy Witkiewicz. Edited and translated by Daniel Gerould and C.S. Durer; foreword by Jan Kott. (1993)
- Mrożek Reader. Sławomir Mrożek. Editor Daniel Gerould. (2004)
- Playwrights Before the Fall: Eastern European Drama in Times of Revolution. Editor Daniel Gerould. (2010)
- Quick Change: 28 Theatre Essays, 4 Plays in Translations. Daniel Gerould. (2010)
- Romania After 2000: Five New Romanian Plays. Gianina Carbunariu ... [et al.]. Edited by Saviana Stanescu and Daniel Gerould. (2007)
- Theatre/Theory/Theatre: The Major Critical Texts from Aristotle and Zeami to Soyinka and Havel. Edited with introductions by Daniel Gerould. (2000)
- Stanisław I. Witkiewicz, The Beelzebub Sonata: Plays, Essays, Documents. Edited by Daniel Gerould and Jadwiga Kosicka. (1980)
- Twentieth-Century Polish Avant-Garde Drama: Plays, Scenarios, Critical Documents. Stanisław Ignacy Witkiewicz ... [et al.]. Edited, translated, and with an introduction by Daniel Gerould, in collaboration with Eleanor Gerould. (1977)
- Witkacy: Stanisław Ignacy Witkiewicz As an Imaginative Writer. Daniel Gerould. (1981)
- Witkiewicz Reader. Edited, translated, and with an introduction by Daniel Gerould. (1992)
