= Kerry H. Cook =

American geoscientist

Kerry Harrison Cook
- Education: North Carolina State University; Rice University; Villanova University
- Scientific career
- Workplaces: Princeton University; NOAA; Cornell University; University of Texas at Austin
- Thesis: Time-Dependent response of the climate to increasing atmospheric carbon dioxide (1989)

Kerry Harrison Cook is an American climate scientist who is a professor at the University of Texas at Austin. Her research focuses on the analysis of climate variability and change in the tropics using observational analysis and high-resolution numerical modeling. Specialties include the climate of Africa and the dynamics of intense tropical rainfall. She was elected Fellow of the American Meteorological Society in 2009 and was awarded the Joanne Simpson Tropical Meteorology Research Award in 2021. She is the Chair of the American Meteorological Society's Climate Variability and Change Committee.

== Early life and education ==
Cook was an undergraduate student in physics and astronomy at Villanova University. She moved to Rice University as a graduate student, where she worked toward a Master's degree in space physics. She was a doctoral researcher at North Carolina State University while in residence at the Institute for Energy Analysis in Oak Ridge, TN. Her thesis research in atmospheric sciences focused on how the climate responds to increasing levels of carbon dioxide. After a one-year post doctoral appointment at Oak Ridge National Laboratory, Cook continued her scientific career at Princeton University's Geophysical Fluid Dynamics Laboratory of the National Oceanic and Atmospheric Administration.

== Research and career ==
Cook was appointed to the faculty at Cornell University in 1991, where she continued her use of global climate modeling to study the effects of continents and topography on tropical atmospheric dynamics and rainfall distributions, and then developed approaches for studying climate variability and change using limited-area models that provide higher resolution than the global models. At Cornell she was a founder of the undergraduate degree on the Science of Earth Systems. In 2008, Cook moved to the University of Texas at Austin. She was elected a Fellow of the American Meteorological Society in 2009. Her research considers the climate catastrophe, and how to better predict climate change on regional space scales around the world. She uses numerical models that include atmospheric, oceanic and vegetation components to understand the physics of climate change and variability in the tropics, especially over South America and Africa. Cook was awarded the inaugural 2021 Joanne Simpson Tropical Meteorology Research Award. She has served on the board of trustees of the University Corporation for Atmospheric Research and as an editor of the Journal of Climate.

== Selected publications ==
- Neelin, J. David; Held, Isaac M.; Cook, Kerry H. (1987). "Evaporation-Wind Feedback and Low-Frequency Variability in the Tropical Atmosphere". Journal of the Atmospheric Sciences. 44 (16): 2341–2348. Bibcode:1987JAtS...44.2341N. doi:10.1175/1520-0469(1987)044<2341:ewfalf>2.0.co;2. ISSN 0022-4928.
- Cook, Kerry H.; Vizy, Edward K. (2015). "Effects of Twenty-First-Century Climate Change on the Amazon Rain Forest". Journal of Climate. 21 (3): 542–560. Bibcode:2015JCli...28.6560C. doi:10.1175/JCLI-D-14-00230.1. ISSN 0022-4928. S2CID 130794907.
- Lenters, J. D.; Cook, K. H. (1997). "On the Origin of the Bolivian High and Related Circulation Features of the South American Climate". Journal of the Atmospheric Sciences. 54 (5): 656–678. Bibcode:1997JAtS...54..656L. doi:10.1175/1520-0469(1997)054<0656:otootb>2.0.co;2. ISSN 0022-4928.
- Cook, Kerry H. (1999). "Generation of the African easterly jet and its role in determining West African precipitation". Journal of Climate. 12 (5): 1165. Bibcode:1999JCli...12.1165C. doi:10.1175/1520-0442(1999)012<1165:GOTAEJ>2.0.CO;2. OCLC 1075469300. S2CID 129820176.
- Vizy, Edward K.; Cook, Kerry H. (2013). "Projections of a wetter Sahel in the twenty-first century from global and regional models". Journal of Climate. 26 (13): 4667–4687. Bibcode:2015JCli...28.6560C. doi:10.1175/JCLI-D-12-00533.1. ISSN 0022-4928. S2CID 130794907.
- Cook, Kerry H.; Vizy, Edward K. (2015). "Detection and analysis of an amplified warming of the Sahara Desert". Journal of Climate. 28 (16): 6560–6580. Bibcode:2015JCli...28.6560C. doi:10.1175/JCLI-D-14-00230.1. ISSN 0022-4928. S2CID 130794907.
- Cook, Kerry H.; Vizy, Edward K. (2022). "Hydrodynamics of regional and seasonal variations in Congo Basin precipitation". Climate Dynamics. 59 (4): 1775–1797. Bibcode:2015JCli...28.6560C. doi:10.1007/s00382-021-06066-3. ISSN 0022-4928. S2CID 130794907.

=== Books ===
- Cook, Kerry Harrison (2013). Climate dynamics. Princeton, N.J.: Princeton University Press. OCLC 1232439609.
