= National Hurricane Research Project =

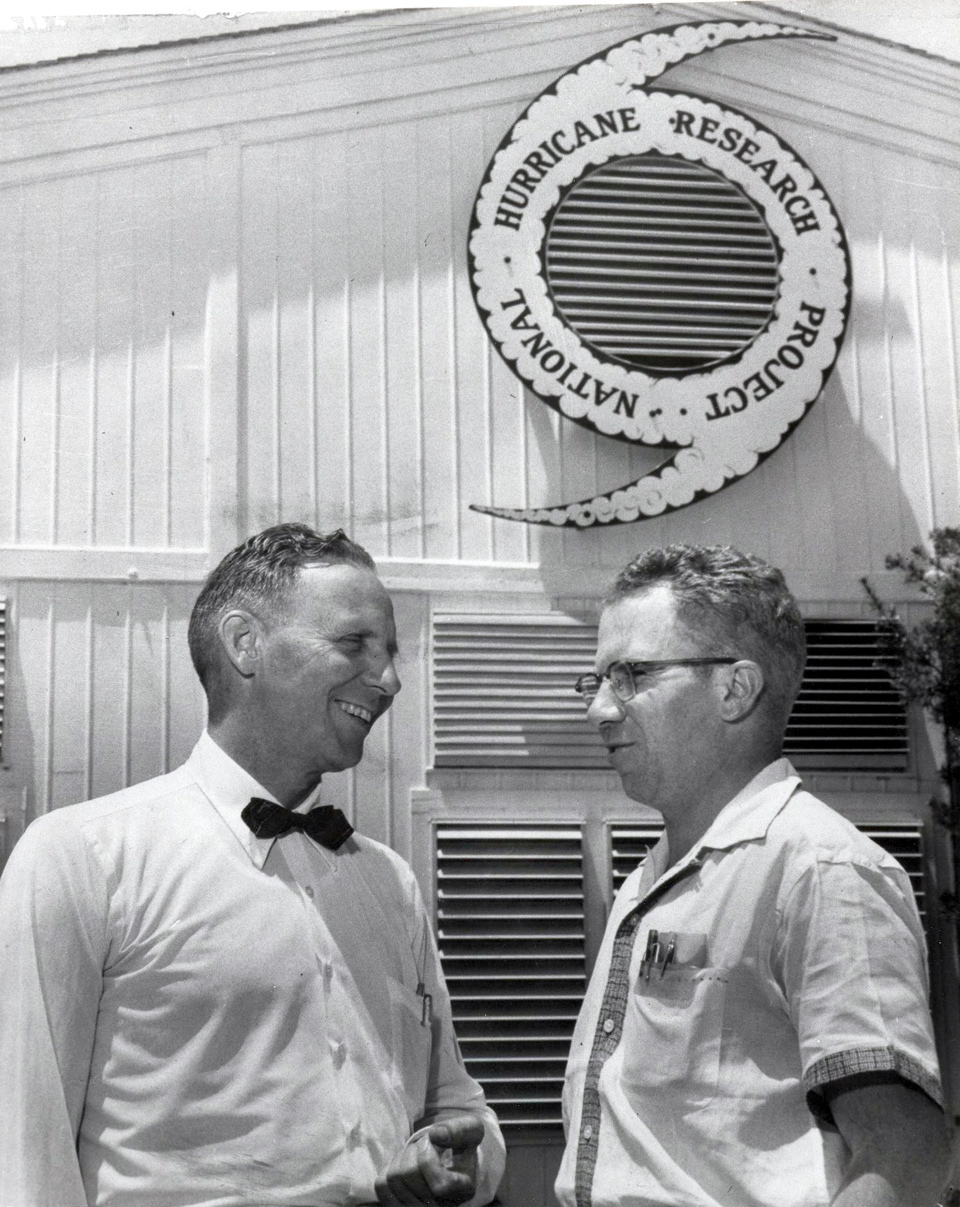
NHRP opening day with Robert Simpson and Cecil Gentry.

The National Hurricane Research Project (NHRP) was initiated in 1955 by the United States Weather Bureau in response to the devastating 1954 hurricane season, which saw hurricanes Carol, Edna, and Hazel bring destruction and flooding to New England and the Mid-Atlantic States. Robert Simpson, a Weather Bureau meteorologist who had participated in Air Force hurricane reconnaissance flights as an observer, was appointed as the first director of NHRP and organized the Research Operations Base at Morrison Air Force Base (now Palm Beach International Airport) in West Palm Beach, FL in 1956.

== Description ==
During the first three years of the Project, scientists used three specially instrumented Air Force Hurricane Hunters aircraft with crews on bailment from the 55th Weather Reconnaissance Squadron. They flew missions into hurricanes Greta (1956), Audrey (1957), Daisy (1958), and Helene (1958) in this initial period, collecting data which delineated the structure and energy budget of hurricanes for the first time.

In 1959, the Project was moved to Miami and collocated with the Miami hurricane forecast office. Simpson left the Project to complete his doctoral degree and Robert Cecil Gentry was appointed NHRP director. The Department of Commerce leased two Douglas DC-6 aircraft and received a Martin B-57 Canberra jet from the Air Force so that NHRP could continue to carry out airborne experiments on hurricanes. The combination of research project, forecast center, and aircraft facility was dubbed the "National Hurricane Center" (NHC). This has caused later confusion, since 1967 the NHC name has been used exclusively by the forecast center. However the Project and Research Flight Facility (RFF) remained separate entities, with their own personnel, budgets, and objectives.

During the 1960s, while NHRP continued to carry out research flights into hurricanes Donna (1960), Cleo (1964), and Betsy (1965), the Project also began to create computer models of hurricane circulation, formulated a statistical track program (NHC-64), wrote a manual on hurricane forecasting, and evaluate the accuracy of track forecasts. Starting with Hurricane Esther (1961), NHRP was heavily involved with Project Stormfury, the U. S. Government's experiment in hurricane modification. They seeded hurricane Beulah in 1963, but had to wait six more years before a suitable candidate storm entered their operational area.

Late in 1964, the Project was renamed the National Hurricane Research Laboratory in recognition of it becoming a permanent institution within the Weather Bureau. This presaged the creation of the Environmental Research Laboratories the next year.
