= Hurricane Research Division =

The Hurricane Research Division (HRD) is a section of the Atlantic Oceanographic and Meteorological Laboratory (AOML) in Miami, Florida, and is the U.S. National Oceanic and Atmospheric Administration's (NOAA) focus for tropical cyclone research. The thirty member division is not a part of the National Hurricane Center but cooperates closely with them in carrying out its annual field program and in transitioning research results into operational tools for hurricane forecasters. HRD was formed from the National Hurricane Research Laboratory in 1984, when it was transferred to AOML and unified with the oceanographic laboratories.

In August, 1992, the AOML/HRD facility sustained moderate damage after the passage of Hurricane Andrew across southern Dade County, Florida, however, despite significant personal disruption to the lives of almost all of its staff members, HRD reconnaissance flights continued into Andrew until it made a final landfall along the Louisiana coastline several days later.

During the 1990s the HRD staff continued to refine its forecasting models, and although a period that included the retirement or transfer of several long-time key research staff members, flew research flights into a number of notable hurricanes of that decade, including Hurricane Opal (1995) and Hurricane Georges (1998).

During the disastrous 2005 Atlantic hurricane season, the HRD staff flew ongoing missions into infamous Hurricane Katrina, which provided invaluable data that continues to be studied at their Miami facility.

Every hurricane season, HRD carries out an annual field program during which it collects information on tropical cyclones (especially Atlantic hurricanes) in order to improve scientific understanding of their formation, structure, and dynamics. Data is collected from satellites, land-based radar, wind towers, and from aircraft. They archive flight information from Air Force Reserve Hurricane Hunters, and plan and participate in research flights on NOAA's Aircraft Operations Center planes. The present fleet consists of two Orion P-3 four-engine turboprops, which can fly directly into the eye of hurricanes, and a Gulfstream IV high-altitude jet, which is used to fly around tropical cyclones, dropping instrument packages called dropsondes.

When not engaged in field operations, HRD scientists and computer programmers process and interpret the information they have gathered. They also work on theoretical studies and produce computer simulations of tropical cyclones and tropical weather. In this work, they collaborate with scientists from many other government and academic institutions from around the globe. The results of their research are presented at conferences and published in the scientific literature.
