= Herbert Riehl =

- Born: March 30, 1915
- Died: June 1, 1997 (aged 82)
- Citizenship: Germany; United States (1939)
- Education: New York University (M.S.); University of Chicago (Ph.D.)
- Known for: Largely developed the subfield of tropical meteorology
- Awards: Carl-Gustaf Rossby Research Medal
- Scientific career
- Fields: Meteorology
- Thesis: Subtropical Flow Patterns in Summer (1947)
- Academic advisors: Horace R. Byers
- Doctoral students: Joanne Malkus, T. N. Krishnamurti, William M. Gray

Herbert Riehl (March 30, 1915 – June 1, 1997) was a German-born American meteorologist who is widely regarded as the father of tropical meteorology. He is well known for his work with Joanne Simpson on the importance of hot towers, and their critical role in transport of energy out of the tropics via the Hadley circulation. He was responsible for founding the atmospheric science department at Colorado State University.

== Awards ==
- American Meteorological Society's Clarence Leroy Meisinger Award (1947)
- American Institute for Aeronautics and Astronautics Losey Award (1962)
- American Meteorological Society Carl-Gustaf Rossby Research Medal (1979)

Riehl wrote the first textbook on tropical meteorology.
