= Equivalent potential temperature =

Quantity in atmospheric thermodynamics

Equivalent potential temperature, commonly referred to as theta-e $\left( \theta_e \right)$, is a quantity that is conserved during changes to an air parcel's pressure (that is, during vertical motions in the atmosphere), even if water vapor condenses during that pressure change. It is therefore more conserved than the ordinary potential temperature, which remains constant only for unsaturated vertical motions (pressure changes).

$\theta_e$ is the temperature a parcel of air would reach, if lifted to the point of saturation, if all the water vapor in the parcel were to condense out, releasing its latent heat, and the parcel was brought adiabatically to a standard reference pressure, usually 1000 hPa (1000 mbar) which is roughly equal to atmospheric pressure at sea level.

== Use in estimating atmospheric stability ==
=== Stability of incompressible fluid ===
Like a ball balanced on top of a hill, denser fluid lying above less dense fluid would be dynamically unstable: overturning motions (convection) can lower the center of gravity, and thus will occur spontaneously, rapidly producing a stable stratification (see also stratification (water)) which is thus the observed condition almost all the time. The condition for stability of an incompressible fluid is that density decreases monotonically with height.

=== Stability of compressible air: Potential temperature ===
If a fluid is compressible like air, the criterion for dynamic stability instead involves potential density, the density of the fluid at a fixed reference pressure. For an ideal gas (see gas laws), the stability criterion for an air column is that potential temperature increases monotonically with height.

To understand this, consider dry convection in the atmosphere, where the vertical variation in pressure is substantial and adiabatic temperature change is important: As a parcel of air moves upward, the ambient pressure drops, causing the parcel to expand. Some of the internal energy of the parcel is used up in doing the work required to expand against the atmospheric pressure, so the temperature of the parcel drops, even though it has not lost any heat. Conversely, a sinking parcel is compressed and becomes warmer even though no heat is added.

Air at the top of a mountain is usually colder than the air in the valley below, but the arrangement is not unstable: if a parcel of air from the valley were somehow lifted up to the top of the mountain, when it arrived it would be even colder than the air already there, due to adiabatic cooling; it would be heavier than the ambient air, and would sink back toward its original position. Similarly, if a parcel of cold mountain-top air were to make the trip down to the valley, it would arrive warmer and lighter than the valley air, and would float back up the mountain.

So cool air lying on top of warm air can be stable, as long as the temperature decrease with height is less than the adiabatic lapse rate; the dynamically important quantity is not the temperature, but the potential temperature—the temperature the air would have if it were brought adiabatically to a reference pressure. The air around the mountain is stable because the air at the top, due to its lower pressure, has a higher potential temperature than the warmer air below.

=== Effects of water condensation: Equivalent potential temperature ===
A rising parcel of air containing water vapor, if it rises far enough, reaches its lifted condensation level: it becomes saturated with water vapor (see Clausius–Clapeyron relation). If the parcel of air continues to rise, water vapor condenses and releases its latent heat to the surrounding air, partially offsetting the adiabatic cooling. A saturated parcel of air therefore cools less than a dry one would as it rises (its temperature changes with height at the moist adiabatic lapse rate, which is smaller than the dry adiabatic lapse rate). Such a saturated parcel of air can achieve buoyancy, and thus accelerate further upward, a runaway condition (instability) even if potential temperature increases with height. The sufficient condition for an air column to be absolutely stable, even with respect to saturated convective motions, is that the equivalent potential temperature must increase monotonically with height.

== Formula ==
The definition of the equivalent potential temperature is:

$$\theta_e = T \left(\frac{p_0}{p} \right)^{R_d / (c_{pd} + r_t c)} H^{-r_v R_v / (c_{pd} + r_t c)} \exp \left[ \frac{L_v r_v}{(c_{pd} + r_t c) T} \right]$$

Where:

- $T$ is the temperature [K] of air at pressure $p$,
- $p_0$ is a reference pressure that is taken as 1000 hPa,
- $p$ is the pressure at the point,
- $R_d$ and $R_v$ are the specific gas constants of dry air and of water vapour, respectively,
- $c_{pd}$ and $c$ are the specific heat capacities of dry air and of liquid water, respectively,
- $r_t$ and $r_v$ are the total water and water vapour mixing ratios, respectively,
- $H$ is the relative humidity,
- $L_v$ is the latent heat of vapourisation of water.

A number of approximate formulations are used for calculating equivalent potential temperature, since it is not easy to compute integrations along motion of the parcel. Bolton (1980) gives review of such procedures with estimates of error. His best approximation formula is used when accuracy is needed:

$$\theta_e = \theta_{L} \exp \left[ \left( \frac{3036}{T_L} - 1.78 \right) r \left(1 + 0.448 r\right)\right]$$
$$\theta_{L} = T \left(\frac{p_0}{p - e}\right)^{\kappa_d} \left(\frac{T}{T_L}\right)^{0.28 r}$$
$$T_L = \frac{1}{ \frac{1}{T_d - 56} + \frac{\log_e(T/T_d)}{800} } + 56$$

Where:

- $\theta_L$ is (dry) potential temperature [K] at the lifted condensation level (LCL),
- $T_L$ is (approximated) temperature [K] at LCL,
- $T_d$ is dew point temperature at pressure $p$,
- $e$ is the water vapor pressure (to obtain $\theta_{L}$ for dry air),
- $\kappa_d = R_d / c_{pd}$ is the ratio of the specific gas constant to the specific heat of dry air at constant pressure (0.2854),
- $r$ is mixing ratio of water vapor mass per mass [kg/kg] (sometimes value is given in [g/kg] and that should be divided by 1000).

A little more theoretical formula is commonly used in literature like Holton (1972) when theoretical explanation is important:

$$\theta_e \approx \theta_L\exp\left[\frac{ r_s(T_L) L_v(T_L) }{ c_{pd} T_L }\right]$$

Where:

- $r_s(T_L)$ is saturated mixing ratio of water at temperature $T_L$, the temperature at the saturation level of the air,
- $L_v(T_L)$ is latent heat of evaporation at temperature $T_L$ (2406 kJ/kg {at 40 °C} to 2501 kJ/kg {at 0 °C}), and
- $c_{pd}$ is specific heat of dry air at constant pressure (1005.7 J/(kg·K)).

Further more simplified formula is used (in, for example, Stull 1988 §13.1 p. 546) for simplicity, if it is desirable to avoid computing $T_L$:

$$\theta_e = T_e \left( \frac{p_0}{p} \right)^{\kappa_d} \approx \left( T + \frac {L_v}{c_{pd}} r \right) \left( \frac{p_0}{p} \right)^\frac{R_d}{c_{pd}}$$

Where:

- $T_e$ = equivalent temperature
- $R_d$ = specific gas constant for air (287.04 J/(kg·K))

== Usage ==
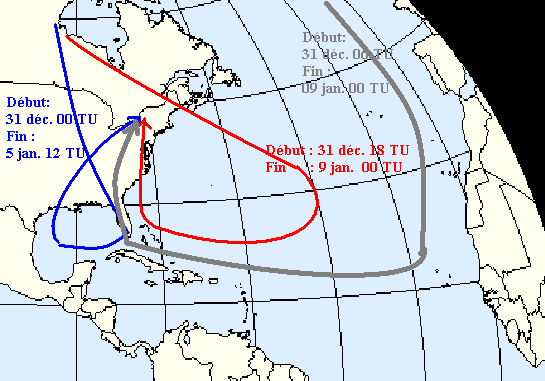
Back trajectories of air masses between December 31, 1997, and January 1998 which caused the North American Ice Storm of 1998

This applies on the synoptic scale for characterisation of air masses. For instance, in a study of the North American Ice Storm of 1998, professors Gyakum (McGill University, Montreal) and Roebber (University of Wisconsin-Milwaukee) have demonstrated that the air masses involved originated from high Arctic at an altitude of 300 to 400 hPa the previous week, went down toward the surface as they moved to the Tropics, then moved back up along the Mississippi Valley toward the St. Lawrence Valley. The back trajectories were evaluated using the constant equivalent potential temperatures.

In the mesoscale, equivalent potential temperature is also a useful measure of the static stability of the unsaturated atmosphere. Under normal, stably stratified conditions, the potential temperature increases with height,

$$\frac{\partial \theta_e}{\partial z} > 0$$

and vertical motions are suppressed. If the equivalent potential temperature decreases with height,

$$\frac{\partial \theta_e}{\partial z} < 0$$

the atmosphere is unstable to vertical motions, and convection is likely. Situations in which the equivalent potential temperature decreases with height, indicating instability in saturated air, are quite common.

== See also ==
- Meteorology
- Moist static energy
- Potential temperature
- Weather forecasting

== Bibliography ==
- M K Yau and R.R. Rogers, Short Course in Cloud Physics, Third Edition, published by Butterworth-Heinemann, January 1, 1989, 304 pages. ISBN 9780750632157 ISBN 0-7506-3215-1
