= Entrainment (meteorology) =

Phenomenon of the atmosphere

Air flows in and around a convective cloud

Entrainment is a phenomenon in the atmosphere that occurs when a turbulent flow captures a non-turbulent flow. It is typically used to refer to the capture of a wind flow with high moisture content or in the case of tropical cyclones, the capture of drier air.

Detrainment is the opposite effect, when the air from a convective cloud, usually at its top, is injected into the environment.

== Theory ==
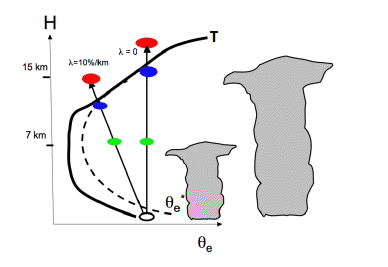
Diagram showing the variation of temperature (T) with height in the environment and the effect of the entrainment rate ($\lambda$) on the top height of a cumulonimbus

Entrainment is mixing environmental air into a preexisting air current or cloud so that the environmental air becomes part of the current or cloud. The entrainment coefficient in clouds is one of the most sensitive variables causing uncertainty in climate models.

Homogeneous mixing is a model that assumes that the timescale for the mixing within a cloud is short compared to the evaporation timescale. This would imply that the dry, unsaturated, environmental air would be entrained throughout the cloud before it evaporates the cloud droplets. The entrainment mixing resulting from this model manifests as partial evaporation of all the drops within the cloud but no change in the number of cloud drops. A contrasting model of entrainment is inhomogeneous mixing. This model assumes that the time it takes to evaporate cloud drops is short compared to the mixing timescales. Therefore, the saturated air that mixes with the unsaturated environment air would completely evaporate the cloud drops within the entrained area, reducing the total number of cloud drops.

The major difference between the two models is how they affect the shape of the cloud drop spectrum. Homogeneous mixing changes the spectrum's shape because the supersaturation differs over large and minor drops. Exposing a cloud to homogeneously mixed entrained air will result in a narrower cloud drop spectrum, while inhomogeneous mixing does not change the spectrum.

== Entrainment rate ==
Cumulus clouds significantly impact energy and water vapor transport and influence precipitation and climate. In large-scale models, cumulus clouds need to be parameterized. The entrainment rate is a key parameter in cumulus parameterization. Henry Stommel was the first to study the entrainment rate in cumulus clouds.
