= List of minor planets: 171001–172000 =

The following is a partial list of minor planets, running from minor-planet number 171001 through 172000, inclusive. The primary data for this and other partial lists is based on JPL's "Small-Body Orbital Elements" and data available from the Minor Planet Center. Critical list information is also provided by the MPC, unless otherwise specified from Lowell Observatory. A detailed description of the table's columns and additional sources are given on the main page including a complete list of every page in this series, and a statistical break-up on the dynamical classification of minor planets.

Also see the summary list of all named bodies in numerical and alphabetical order, and the corresponding naming citations for the number range of this particular list. New namings may only be added to this list after official publication, as the preannouncement of names is condemned by the Working Group for Small Bodies Nomenclature of the International Astronomical Union.

| Near-Earth obj. | MBA (inner) | MBA (outer) | Centaur |
| Mars-crosser | MBA (middle) | Jupiter trojan | Trans-Neptunian obj. |
| Unclassified |

== 171001–171100 ==
| Designation | | | Discovery | | | Properties | | Ref |
| Permanent | Provisional | Named after | Date | Site | Discoverer(s) | Category | Diam. | Ref |
|---|---|---|---|---|---|---|---|---|
| 171001 | 2005 EZ_{16} | — | March 3, 2005 | Kitt Peak | Spacewatch | · | 3.6 km | MPC · JPL |
| 171002 | 2005 EB_{19} | — | March 3, 2005 | Kitt Peak | Spacewatch | · | 2.1 km | MPC · JPL |
| 171003 | 2005 EQ_{20} | — | March 3, 2005 | Catalina | CSS | · | 2.8 km | MPC · JPL |
| 171004 | 2005 EU_{23} | — | March 3, 2005 | Catalina | CSS | · | 1.9 km | MPC · JPL |
| 171005 | 2005 EQ_{24} | — | March 3, 2005 | Catalina | CSS | · | 2.3 km | MPC · JPL |
| 171006 | 2005 EF_{26} | — | March 3, 2005 | Catalina | CSS | · | 1.4 km | MPC · JPL |
| 171007 | 2005 EX_{26} | — | March 3, 2005 | Catalina | CSS | · | 2.3 km | MPC · JPL |
| 171008 | 2005 ET_{28} | — | March 3, 2005 | Catalina | CSS | · | 2.8 km | MPC · JPL |
| 171009 | 2005 EL_{31} | — | March 2, 2005 | Kitt Peak | Spacewatch | · | 2.1 km | MPC · JPL |
| 171010 | 2005 ER_{32} | — | March 3, 2005 | Catalina | CSS | ERI | 3.0 km | MPC · JPL |
| 171011 | 2005 EY_{36} | — | March 4, 2005 | Socorro | LINEAR | NYS | 1.5 km | MPC · JPL |
| 171012 | 2005 ED_{37} | — | March 4, 2005 | Socorro | LINEAR | · | 2.3 km | MPC · JPL |
| 171013 | 2005 EL_{37} | — | March 4, 2005 | Mount Lemmon | Mount Lemmon Survey | · | 3.0 km | MPC · JPL |
| 171014 | 2005 EZ_{37} | — | March 4, 2005 | Kitt Peak | Spacewatch | · | 1.9 km | MPC · JPL |
| 171015 | 2005 EU_{38} | — | March 8, 2005 | RAS | Lowe, A. | · | 2.0 km | MPC · JPL |
| 171016 | 2005 ET_{40} | — | March 1, 2005 | Kitt Peak | Spacewatch | PAD | 3.9 km | MPC · JPL |
| 171017 | 2005 EL_{44} | — | March 3, 2005 | Kitt Peak | Spacewatch | NYS · | 2.7 km | MPC · JPL |
| 171018 | 2005 EA_{45} | — | March 3, 2005 | Catalina | CSS | NYS | 1.9 km | MPC · JPL |
| 171019 | 2005 EA_{46} | — | March 3, 2005 | Catalina | CSS | · | 1.8 km | MPC · JPL |
| 171020 | 2005 ED_{46} | — | March 3, 2005 | Catalina | CSS | · | 1.8 km | MPC · JPL |
| 171021 | 2005 ER_{48} | — | March 3, 2005 | Catalina | CSS | MAS | 1.4 km | MPC · JPL |
| 171022 | 2005 ES_{48} | — | March 3, 2005 | Catalina | CSS | NYS | 1.5 km | MPC · JPL |
| 171023 | 2005 EY_{48} | — | March 3, 2005 | Catalina | CSS | · | 1.7 km | MPC · JPL |
| 171024 | 2005 EW_{49} | — | March 3, 2005 | Kitt Peak | Spacewatch | · | 1.5 km | MPC · JPL |
| 171025 | 2005 ER_{51} | — | March 3, 2005 | Catalina | CSS | · | 3.1 km | MPC · JPL |
| 171026 | 2005 EU_{53} | — | March 4, 2005 | Kitt Peak | Spacewatch | · | 1.8 km | MPC · JPL |
| 171027 | 2005 EN_{57} | — | March 4, 2005 | Mount Lemmon | Mount Lemmon Survey | CLA | 4.6 km | MPC · JPL |
| 171028 | 2005 EY_{58} | — | March 4, 2005 | Mount Lemmon | Mount Lemmon Survey | · | 2.6 km | MPC · JPL |
| 171029 | 2005 EZ_{58} | — | March 4, 2005 | Mount Lemmon | Mount Lemmon Survey | NYS | 1.2 km | MPC · JPL |
| 171030 | 2005 EN_{60} | — | March 4, 2005 | Catalina | CSS | · | 2.7 km | MPC · JPL |
| 171031 | 2005 EK_{61} | — | March 4, 2005 | Catalina | CSS | · | 1.9 km | MPC · JPL |
| 171032 | 2005 ES_{61} | — | March 4, 2005 | Socorro | LINEAR | · | 1.7 km | MPC · JPL |
| 171033 | 2005 EA_{62} | — | March 4, 2005 | Mount Lemmon | Mount Lemmon Survey | · | 1.7 km | MPC · JPL |
| 171034 | 2005 EK_{66} | — | March 4, 2005 | Catalina | CSS | EUN | 2.4 km | MPC · JPL |
| 171035 | 2005 EV_{71} | — | March 2, 2005 | Catalina | CSS | · | 2.1 km | MPC · JPL |
| 171036 | 2005 EW_{71} | — | March 2, 2005 | Catalina | CSS | · | 1.9 km | MPC · JPL |
| 171037 | 2005 EC_{73} | — | March 2, 2005 | Catalina | CSS | · | 2.0 km | MPC · JPL |
| 171038 | 2005 EH_{77} | — | March 3, 2005 | Kitt Peak | Spacewatch | MAS | 730 m | MPC · JPL |
| 171039 | 2005 ER_{79} | — | March 3, 2005 | Catalina | CSS | · | 3.6 km | MPC · JPL |
| 171040 | 2005 ES_{79} | — | March 3, 2005 | Catalina | CSS | · | 1.7 km | MPC · JPL |
| 171041 | 2005 EH_{84} | — | March 4, 2005 | Socorro | LINEAR | · | 1.4 km | MPC · JPL |
| 171042 | 2005 EG_{85} | — | March 4, 2005 | Socorro | LINEAR | · | 1.5 km | MPC · JPL |
| 171043 | 2005 EG_{90} | — | March 8, 2005 | Anderson Mesa | LONEOS | · | 2.3 km | MPC · JPL |
| 171044 | 2005 EU_{93} | — | March 8, 2005 | Socorro | LINEAR | · | 3.1 km | MPC · JPL |
| 171045 | 2005 ES_{96} | — | March 3, 2005 | Catalina | CSS | · | 2.0 km | MPC · JPL |
| 171046 | 2005 ES_{97} | — | March 3, 2005 | Catalina | CSS | · | 1.8 km | MPC · JPL |
| 171047 | 2005 EM_{99} | — | March 3, 2005 | Catalina | CSS | · | 5.1 km | MPC · JPL |
| 171048 | 2005 EN_{101} | — | March 3, 2005 | Catalina | CSS | · | 3.8 km | MPC · JPL |
| 171049 | 2005 EK_{102} | — | March 3, 2005 | Kitt Peak | Spacewatch | · | 1.9 km | MPC · JPL |
| 171050 | 2005 EK_{108} | — | March 4, 2005 | Catalina | CSS | · | 3.2 km | MPC · JPL |
| 171051 | 2005 EJ_{109} | — | March 4, 2005 | Catalina | CSS | · | 2.7 km | MPC · JPL |
| 171052 | 2005 ES_{112} | — | March 4, 2005 | Mount Lemmon | Mount Lemmon Survey | · | 1.5 km | MPC · JPL |
| 171053 | 2005 ET_{115} | — | March 4, 2005 | Mount Lemmon | Mount Lemmon Survey | (5) | 2.2 km | MPC · JPL |
| 171054 | 2005 EA_{117} | — | March 4, 2005 | Mount Lemmon | Mount Lemmon Survey | · | 2.0 km | MPC · JPL |
| 171055 | 2005 EY_{119} | — | March 8, 2005 | Anderson Mesa | LONEOS | · | 1.5 km | MPC · JPL |
| 171056 | 2005 ED_{121} | — | March 8, 2005 | Socorro | LINEAR | ELF | 5.4 km | MPC · JPL |
| 171057 | 2005 EP_{121} | — | March 8, 2005 | Anderson Mesa | LONEOS | MIS | 2.2 km | MPC · JPL |
| 171058 | 2005 EY_{123} | — | March 8, 2005 | Socorro | LINEAR | · | 2.2 km | MPC · JPL |
| 171059 | 2005 EC_{125} | — | March 8, 2005 | Mount Lemmon | Mount Lemmon Survey | · | 2.8 km | MPC · JPL |
| 171060 | 2005 EG_{126} | — | March 8, 2005 | Socorro | LINEAR | GAL | 2.6 km | MPC · JPL |
| 171061 | 2005 ER_{126} | — | March 8, 2005 | Mount Lemmon | Mount Lemmon Survey | MAS | 760 m | MPC · JPL |
| 171062 | 2005 EV_{127} | — | March 9, 2005 | Kitt Peak | Spacewatch | V | 980 m | MPC · JPL |
| 171063 | 2005 EY_{133} | — | March 9, 2005 | Socorro | LINEAR | · | 1.5 km | MPC · JPL |
| 171064 | 2005 EX_{135} | — | March 9, 2005 | Anderson Mesa | LONEOS | · | 2.1 km | MPC · JPL |
| 171065 | 2005 EL_{138} | — | March 9, 2005 | Socorro | LINEAR | · | 1.7 km | MPC · JPL |
| 171066 | 2005 ER_{142} | — | March 10, 2005 | Catalina | CSS | · | 4.6 km | MPC · JPL |
| 171067 | 2005 EZ_{147} | — | March 10, 2005 | Kitt Peak | Spacewatch | NYS | 1.9 km | MPC · JPL |
| 171068 | 2005 EQ_{151} | — | March 10, 2005 | Kitt Peak | Spacewatch | · | 4.1 km | MPC · JPL |
| 171069 | 2005 ES_{152} | — | March 10, 2005 | Kitt Peak | Spacewatch | KOR | 2.2 km | MPC · JPL |
| 171070 | 2005 EK_{156} | — | March 9, 2005 | Catalina | CSS | GEF | 2.3 km | MPC · JPL |
| 171071 | 2005 EZ_{156} | — | March 9, 2005 | Mount Lemmon | Mount Lemmon Survey | ANF | 2.5 km | MPC · JPL |
| 171072 | 2005 ER_{165} | — | March 11, 2005 | Kitt Peak | Spacewatch | NYS | 1.5 km | MPC · JPL |
| 171073 | 2005 EQ_{167} | — | March 11, 2005 | Mount Lemmon | Mount Lemmon Survey | PAD | 4.6 km | MPC · JPL |
| 171074 | 2005 EL_{171} | — | March 7, 2005 | Socorro | LINEAR | · | 2.3 km | MPC · JPL |
| 171075 | 2005 EW_{176} | — | March 8, 2005 | Mount Lemmon | Mount Lemmon Survey | · | 2.1 km | MPC · JPL |
| 171076 | 2005 EA_{178} | — | March 9, 2005 | Kitt Peak | Spacewatch | · | 1.7 km | MPC · JPL |
| 171077 | 2005 EL_{178} | — | March 9, 2005 | Kitt Peak | Spacewatch | · | 1.2 km | MPC · JPL |
| 171078 | 2005 EM_{181} | — | March 9, 2005 | Anderson Mesa | LONEOS | · | 1.6 km | MPC · JPL |
| 171079 | 2005 EB_{182} | — | March 9, 2005 | Socorro | LINEAR | KOR | 2.2 km | MPC · JPL |
| 171080 | 2005 EV_{182} | — | March 9, 2005 | Socorro | LINEAR | NEM | 2.6 km | MPC · JPL |
| 171081 | 2005 EG_{185} | — | March 9, 2005 | Siding Spring | SSS | · | 3.2 km | MPC · JPL |
| 171082 | 2005 ER_{188} | — | March 10, 2005 | Mount Lemmon | Mount Lemmon Survey | · | 1.2 km | MPC · JPL |
| 171083 | 2005 EZ_{188} | — | March 10, 2005 | Kitt Peak | Spacewatch | · | 2.4 km | MPC · JPL |
| 171084 | 2005 EO_{193} | — | March 11, 2005 | Mount Lemmon | Mount Lemmon Survey | · | 1.6 km | MPC · JPL |
| 171085 | 2005 EF_{197} | — | March 11, 2005 | Anderson Mesa | LONEOS | · | 1.4 km | MPC · JPL |
| 171086 | 2005 EL_{197} | — | March 11, 2005 | Anderson Mesa | LONEOS | · | 3.5 km | MPC · JPL |
| 171087 | 2005 EB_{204} | — | March 11, 2005 | Kitt Peak | Spacewatch | MAS | 1.0 km | MPC · JPL |
| 171088 | 2005 EE_{205} | — | March 11, 2005 | Kitt Peak | Spacewatch | · | 1.7 km | MPC · JPL |
| 171089 | 2005 EB_{206} | — | March 13, 2005 | Catalina | CSS | · | 3.0 km | MPC · JPL |
| 171090 | 2005 ET_{207} | — | March 12, 2005 | Kitt Peak | Spacewatch | · | 3.4 km | MPC · JPL |
| 171091 | 2005 EN_{212} | — | March 4, 2005 | Catalina | CSS | · | 3.1 km | MPC · JPL |
| 171092 | 2005 EO_{215} | — | March 8, 2005 | Kitt Peak | Spacewatch | · | 1.7 km | MPC · JPL |
| 171093 | 2005 EW_{219} | — | March 10, 2005 | Siding Spring | SSS | · | 2.7 km | MPC · JPL |
| 171094 | 2005 ER_{222} | — | March 8, 2005 | Socorro | LINEAR | · | 2.2 km | MPC · JPL |
| 171095 | 2005 EL_{223} | — | March 11, 2005 | Kitt Peak | Spacewatch | (5) | 1.7 km | MPC · JPL |
| 171096 | 2005 EX_{224} | — | March 12, 2005 | Socorro | LINEAR | HNS | 1.8 km | MPC · JPL |
| 171097 | 2005 EF_{225} | — | March 10, 2005 | Catalina | CSS | · | 2.2 km | MPC · JPL |
| 171098 | 2005 EB_{242} | — | March 11, 2005 | Catalina | CSS | · | 3.1 km | MPC · JPL |
| 171099 | 2005 EH_{251} | — | March 10, 2005 | Mount Lemmon | Mount Lemmon Survey | · | 1.5 km | MPC · JPL |
| 171100 | 2005 EH_{263} | — | March 13, 2005 | Kitt Peak | Spacewatch | · | 2.1 km | MPC · JPL |

== 171101–171200 ==
back to top

| Designation | | | Discovery | | | Properties | | Ref |
| Permanent | Provisional | Named after | Date | Site | Discoverer(s) | Category | Diam. | Ref |
|---|---|---|---|---|---|---|---|---|
| 171101 | 2005 EL_{266} | — | March 13, 2005 | Catalina | CSS | · | 2.6 km | MPC · JPL |
| 171102 | 2005 EZ_{268} | — | March 14, 2005 | Mount Lemmon | Mount Lemmon Survey | · | 2.7 km | MPC · JPL |
| 171103 | 2005 EO_{269} | — | March 15, 2005 | Mount Lemmon | Mount Lemmon Survey | · | 1.5 km | MPC · JPL |
| 171104 | 2005 ER_{277} | — | March 9, 2005 | Catalina | CSS | EUN | 1.8 km | MPC · JPL |
| 171105 | 2005 EG_{280} | — | March 10, 2005 | Catalina | CSS | · | 2.0 km | MPC · JPL |
| 171106 | 2005 EE_{285} | — | March 12, 2005 | Kitt Peak | Spacewatch | · | 2.6 km | MPC · JPL |
| 171107 | 2005 EG_{287} | — | March 3, 2005 | Kitt Peak | Spacewatch | · | 3.3 km | MPC · JPL |
| 171108 | 2005 EM_{289} | — | March 9, 2005 | Catalina | CSS | · | 3.0 km | MPC · JPL |
| 171109 | 2005 EA_{291} | — | March 10, 2005 | Catalina | CSS | · | 2.1 km | MPC · JPL |
| 171110 | 2005 EQ_{292} | — | March 10, 2005 | Anderson Mesa | LONEOS | · | 5.0 km | MPC · JPL |
| 171111 | 2005 EN_{293} | — | March 11, 2005 | Kitt Peak | Spacewatch | · | 3.4 km | MPC · JPL |
| 171112 Sickafoose | 2005 ER_{301} | Sickafoose | March 11, 2005 | Kitt Peak | Gulbis, A. | KOR | 1.6 km | MPC · JPL |
| 171113 | 2005 EY_{305} | — | March 4, 2005 | Kitt Peak | Spacewatch | GEF | 1.6 km | MPC · JPL |
| 171114 | 2005 EC_{311} | — | March 10, 2005 | Mount Lemmon | Mount Lemmon Survey | · | 2.0 km | MPC · JPL |
| 171115 | 2005 FW_{3} | — | March 17, 2005 | Catalina | CSS | · | 6.3 km | MPC · JPL |
| 171116 | 2005 GO | — | April 1, 2005 | Anderson Mesa | LONEOS | · | 4.8 km | MPC · JPL |
| 171117 | 2005 GF_{1} | — | April 1, 2005 | Črni Vrh | Matičič, S. | · | 4.1 km | MPC · JPL |
| 171118 Szigetköz | 2005 GJ_{1} | Szigetköz | April 2, 2005 | Piszkéstető | K. Sárneczky | THM | 3.3 km | MPC · JPL |
| 171119 | 2005 GA_{3} | — | April 1, 2005 | Kitt Peak | Spacewatch | · | 4.1 km | MPC · JPL |
| 171120 | 2005 GN_{4} | — | April 1, 2005 | Kitt Peak | Spacewatch | EUP | 4.5 km | MPC · JPL |
| 171121 | 2005 GM_{7} | — | April 1, 2005 | Anderson Mesa | LONEOS | · | 4.4 km | MPC · JPL |
| 171122 | 2005 GH_{8} | — | April 2, 2005 | Palomar | NEAT | · | 3.8 km | MPC · JPL |
| 171123 | 2005 GU_{11} | — | April 1, 2005 | Anderson Mesa | LONEOS | · | 3.1 km | MPC · JPL |
| 171124 | 2005 GV_{22} | — | April 1, 2005 | Anderson Mesa | LONEOS | · | 3.6 km | MPC · JPL |
| 171125 | 2005 GR_{23} | — | April 1, 2005 | Anderson Mesa | LONEOS | RAF | 1.4 km | MPC · JPL |
| 171126 | 2005 GT_{23} | — | April 1, 2005 | Anderson Mesa | LONEOS | · | 2.7 km | MPC · JPL |
| 171127 | 2005 GT_{26} | — | April 2, 2005 | Anderson Mesa | LONEOS | · | 7.1 km | MPC · JPL |
| 171128 | 2005 GA_{28} | — | April 3, 2005 | Palomar | NEAT | · | 2.1 km | MPC · JPL |
| 171129 | 2005 GG_{28} | — | April 3, 2005 | Siding Spring | SSS | · | 3.3 km | MPC · JPL |
| 171130 | 2005 GC_{31} | — | April 4, 2005 | Catalina | CSS | · | 2.1 km | MPC · JPL |
| 171131 | 2005 GM_{34} | — | April 1, 2005 | Anderson Mesa | LONEOS | GEF | 1.8 km | MPC · JPL |
| 171132 | 2005 GZ_{36} | — | April 2, 2005 | Anderson Mesa | LONEOS | · | 4.0 km | MPC · JPL |
| 171133 | 2005 GP_{38} | — | April 4, 2005 | Kitt Peak | Spacewatch | · | 2.7 km | MPC · JPL |
| 171134 | 2005 GC_{41} | — | April 4, 2005 | Socorro | LINEAR | · | 3.8 km | MPC · JPL |
| 171135 | 2005 GR_{44} | — | April 5, 2005 | Mount Lemmon | Mount Lemmon Survey | THM | 3.0 km | MPC · JPL |
| 171136 | 2005 GW_{52} | — | April 2, 2005 | Mount Lemmon | Mount Lemmon Survey | · | 2.8 km | MPC · JPL |
| 171137 | 2005 GX_{53} | — | April 4, 2005 | Socorro | LINEAR | · | 4.4 km | MPC · JPL |
| 171138 | 2005 GX_{54} | — | April 5, 2005 | Mount Lemmon | Mount Lemmon Survey | GEF | 1.6 km | MPC · JPL |
| 171139 | 2005 GG_{55} | — | April 5, 2005 | Mount Lemmon | Mount Lemmon Survey | THM | 3.7 km | MPC · JPL |
| 171140 | 2005 GX_{56} | — | April 6, 2005 | Kitt Peak | Spacewatch | · | 3.0 km | MPC · JPL |
| 171141 | 2005 GK_{57} | — | April 6, 2005 | Mount Lemmon | Mount Lemmon Survey | · | 2.9 km | MPC · JPL |
| 171142 | 2005 GZ_{58} | — | April 4, 2005 | Catalina | CSS | · | 2.2 km | MPC · JPL |
| 171143 | 2005 GC_{59} | — | April 5, 2005 | Catalina | CSS | · | 2.6 km | MPC · JPL |
| 171144 | 2005 GA_{66} | — | April 2, 2005 | Mount Lemmon | Mount Lemmon Survey | · | 3.6 km | MPC · JPL |
| 171145 | 2005 GD_{66} | — | April 2, 2005 | Mount Lemmon | Mount Lemmon Survey | HOF | 3.9 km | MPC · JPL |
| 171146 | 2005 GH_{67} | — | April 2, 2005 | Mount Lemmon | Mount Lemmon Survey | · | 3.4 km | MPC · JPL |
| 171147 | 2005 GR_{68} | — | April 2, 2005 | Catalina | CSS | fast | 3.5 km | MPC · JPL |
| 171148 | 2005 GX_{68} | — | April 2, 2005 | Catalina | CSS | T_{j} (2.98) · EUP | 6.6 km | MPC · JPL |
| 171149 | 2005 GY_{72} | — | April 4, 2005 | Catalina | CSS | · | 1.2 km | MPC · JPL |
| 171150 | 2005 GB_{73} | — | April 4, 2005 | Catalina | CSS | · | 5.0 km | MPC · JPL |
| 171151 | 2005 GD_{75} | — | April 5, 2005 | Mount Lemmon | Mount Lemmon Survey | · | 3.3 km | MPC · JPL |
| 171152 | 2005 GK_{78} | — | April 6, 2005 | Catalina | CSS | · | 3.5 km | MPC · JPL |
| 171153 Allanrahill | 2005 GL_{81} | Allanrahill | April 10, 2005 | RAS | Lowe, A. | EOS | 3.6 km | MPC · JPL |
| 171154 | 2005 GG_{87} | — | April 4, 2005 | Mount Lemmon | Mount Lemmon Survey | · | 1.8 km | MPC · JPL |
| 171155 | 2005 GN_{88} | — | April 5, 2005 | Mount Lemmon | Mount Lemmon Survey | KOR | 2.0 km | MPC · JPL |
| 171156 | 2005 GA_{90} | — | April 5, 2005 | Kitt Peak | Spacewatch | · | 3.2 km | MPC · JPL |
| 171157 | 2005 GE_{95} | — | April 6, 2005 | Kitt Peak | Spacewatch | · | 3.5 km | MPC · JPL |
| 171158 | 2005 GN_{110} | — | April 10, 2005 | Mount Lemmon | Mount Lemmon Survey | · | 3.6 km | MPC · JPL |
| 171159 | 2005 GM_{112} | — | April 6, 2005 | Kitt Peak | Spacewatch | · | 3.0 km | MPC · JPL |
| 171160 | 2005 GN_{112} | — | April 6, 2005 | Kitt Peak | Spacewatch | · | 2.8 km | MPC · JPL |
| 171161 | 2005 GJ_{114} | — | April 10, 2005 | Mount Lemmon | Mount Lemmon Survey | MAS | 760 m | MPC · JPL |
| 171162 | 2005 GD_{118} | — | April 11, 2005 | Mount Lemmon | Mount Lemmon Survey | THM | 2.9 km | MPC · JPL |
| 171163 | 2005 GF_{119} | — | April 11, 2005 | Anderson Mesa | LONEOS | · | 2.2 km | MPC · JPL |
| 171164 | 2005 GD_{122} | — | April 6, 2005 | Mount Lemmon | Mount Lemmon Survey | · | 1.6 km | MPC · JPL |
| 171165 | 2005 GF_{127} | — | April 12, 2005 | Anderson Mesa | LONEOS | EOS | 3.2 km | MPC · JPL |
| 171166 | 2005 GM_{128} | — | April 13, 2005 | RAS | Lowe, A. | · | 1.5 km | MPC · JPL |
| 171167 | 2005 GE_{134} | — | April 10, 2005 | Kitt Peak | Spacewatch | · | 2.6 km | MPC · JPL |
| 171168 | 2005 GT_{137} | — | April 11, 2005 | Mount Lemmon | Mount Lemmon Survey | · | 2.8 km | MPC · JPL |
| 171169 | 2005 GL_{159} | — | April 12, 2005 | Anderson Mesa | LONEOS | PHO | 2.7 km | MPC · JPL |
| 171170 | 2005 GZ_{163} | — | April 10, 2005 | Mount Lemmon | Mount Lemmon Survey | · | 1.6 km | MPC · JPL |
| 171171 Prior | 2005 GZ_{164} | Prior | April 10, 2005 | Mount Lemmon | Mount Lemmon Survey | · | 2.7 km | MPC · JPL |
| 171172 | 2005 GS_{168} | — | April 12, 2005 | Kitt Peak | Spacewatch | · | 1.8 km | MPC · JPL |
| 171173 | 2005 GT_{168} | — | April 12, 2005 | Kitt Peak | Spacewatch | KOR | 2.0 km | MPC · JPL |
| 171174 | 2005 GW_{169} | — | April 12, 2005 | Kitt Peak | Spacewatch | · | 2.0 km | MPC · JPL |
| 171175 | 2005 GZ_{170} | — | April 12, 2005 | Mount Lemmon | Mount Lemmon Survey | · | 2.2 km | MPC · JPL |
| 171176 | 2005 GF_{172} | — | April 14, 2005 | Kitt Peak | Spacewatch | KOR | 2.3 km | MPC · JPL |
| 171177 | 2005 GY_{178} | — | April 12, 2005 | Kitt Peak | Spacewatch | EOS | 3.2 km | MPC · JPL |
| 171178 | 2005 GL_{179} | — | April 15, 2005 | Kitt Peak | Spacewatch | EUN | 1.7 km | MPC · JPL |
| 171179 | 2005 GX_{214} | — | April 3, 2005 | Palomar | NEAT | · | 1.8 km | MPC · JPL |
| 171180 | 2005 HK | — | April 16, 2005 | Kitt Peak | Spacewatch | HOF | 2.9 km | MPC · JPL |
| 171181 | 2005 HJ_{1} | — | April 16, 2005 | Kitt Peak | Spacewatch | AGN | 1.6 km | MPC · JPL |
| 171182 | 2005 HW_{1} | — | April 16, 2005 | Kitt Peak | Spacewatch | EUN | 3.2 km | MPC · JPL |
| 171183 Haleakala | 2005 HJ_{4} | Haleakala | April 30, 2005 | Haleakala-Faulkes | Faulkes Telescope Educational Project | AGN | 1.6 km | MPC · JPL |
| 171184 | 2005 JB_{1} | — | May 3, 2005 | Catalina | CSS | · | 3.2 km | MPC · JPL |
| 171185 | 2005 JW_{10} | — | May 4, 2005 | Mauna Kea | Veillet, C. | · | 2.4 km | MPC · JPL |
| 171186 | 2005 JQ_{11} | — | May 4, 2005 | Mauna Kea | Veillet, C. | · | 3.9 km | MPC · JPL |
| 171187 | 2005 JV_{15} | — | May 3, 2005 | Kitt Peak | Spacewatch | · | 3.0 km | MPC · JPL |
| 171188 | 2005 JR_{20} | — | May 4, 2005 | Catalina | CSS | · | 4.4 km | MPC · JPL |
| 171189 | 2005 JR_{21} | — | May 4, 2005 | Siding Spring | SSS | URS | 5.7 km | MPC · JPL |
| 171190 | 2005 JQ_{22} | — | May 1, 2005 | Palomar | NEAT | · | 2.1 km | MPC · JPL |
| 171191 | 2005 JT_{22} | — | May 1, 2005 | Palomar | NEAT | · | 3.4 km | MPC · JPL |
| 171192 | 2005 JX_{22} | — | May 2, 2005 | Kitt Peak | Spacewatch | · | 3.6 km | MPC · JPL |
| 171193 | 2005 JG_{25} | — | May 3, 2005 | Kitt Peak | Spacewatch | · | 3.5 km | MPC · JPL |
| 171194 | 2005 JJ_{27} | — | May 3, 2005 | Socorro | LINEAR | · | 3.4 km | MPC · JPL |
| 171195 Richardgreen | 2005 JY_{30} | Richardgreen | May 4, 2005 | Mount Lemmon | Mount Lemmon Survey | DOR | 4.5 km | MPC · JPL |
| 171196 | 2005 JO_{31} | — | May 4, 2005 | Palomar | NEAT | · | 3.1 km | MPC · JPL |
| 171197 | 2005 JF_{32} | — | May 4, 2005 | Mount Lemmon | Mount Lemmon Survey | · | 3.5 km | MPC · JPL |
| 171198 | 2005 JX_{43} | — | May 4, 2005 | Anderson Mesa | LONEOS | · | 3.8 km | MPC · JPL |
| 171199 | 2005 JH_{47} | — | May 3, 2005 | Kitt Peak | Spacewatch | BRA | 2.7 km | MPC · JPL |
| 171200 | 2005 JJ_{48} | — | May 3, 2005 | Kitt Peak | Spacewatch | · | 5.7 km | MPC · JPL |

== 171201–171300 ==
back to top

| Designation | | | Discovery | | | Properties | | Ref |
| Permanent | Provisional | Named after | Date | Site | Discoverer(s) | Category | Diam. | Ref |
|---|---|---|---|---|---|---|---|---|
| 171201 | 2005 JC_{49} | — | May 4, 2005 | Palomar | NEAT | · | 2.7 km | MPC · JPL |
| 171202 | 2005 JS_{55} | — | May 4, 2005 | Palomar | NEAT | CYB | 6.2 km | MPC · JPL |
| 171203 | 2005 JD_{57} | — | May 7, 2005 | Kitt Peak | Spacewatch | · | 1.6 km | MPC · JPL |
| 171204 | 2005 JD_{60} | — | May 8, 2005 | Kitt Peak | Spacewatch | · | 4.6 km | MPC · JPL |
| 171205 | 2005 JD_{61} | — | May 8, 2005 | Kitt Peak | Spacewatch | · | 3.4 km | MPC · JPL |
| 171206 | 2005 JE_{62} | — | May 9, 2005 | Anderson Mesa | LONEOS | · | 2.2 km | MPC · JPL |
| 171207 | 2005 JQ_{63} | — | May 9, 2005 | Catalina | CSS | · | 6.9 km | MPC · JPL |
| 171208 | 2005 JN_{64} | — | May 4, 2005 | Palomar | NEAT | · | 5.9 km | MPC · JPL |
| 171209 | 2005 JJ_{65} | — | May 4, 2005 | Kitt Peak | Spacewatch | AGN | 1.7 km | MPC · JPL |
| 171210 | 2005 JA_{69} | — | May 6, 2005 | Anderson Mesa | LONEOS | · | 3.6 km | MPC · JPL |
| 171211 | 2005 JP_{69} | — | May 7, 2005 | Kitt Peak | Spacewatch | · | 2.4 km | MPC · JPL |
| 171212 | 2005 JA_{70} | — | May 7, 2005 | Kitt Peak | Spacewatch | AEO | 1.6 km | MPC · JPL |
| 171213 | 2005 JD_{72} | — | May 8, 2005 | Kitt Peak | Spacewatch | · | 4.1 km | MPC · JPL |
| 171214 | 2005 JL_{73} | — | May 8, 2005 | Kitt Peak | Spacewatch | EOS | 2.6 km | MPC · JPL |
| 171215 | 2005 JJ_{77} | — | May 10, 2005 | Anderson Mesa | LONEOS | · | 3.9 km | MPC · JPL |
| 171216 | 2005 JG_{85} | — | May 8, 2005 | Socorro | LINEAR | · | 1.8 km | MPC · JPL |
| 171217 | 2005 JN_{87} | — | May 9, 2005 | Catalina | CSS | · | 4.9 km | MPC · JPL |
| 171218 | 2005 JN_{89} | — | May 11, 2005 | Mount Lemmon | Mount Lemmon Survey | · | 2.0 km | MPC · JPL |
| 171219 | 2005 JU_{100} | — | May 9, 2005 | Anderson Mesa | LONEOS | RAF | 1.5 km | MPC · JPL |
| 171220 | 2005 JF_{105} | — | May 11, 2005 | Mount Lemmon | Mount Lemmon Survey | KOR | 2.2 km | MPC · JPL |
| 171221 | 2005 JD_{113} | — | May 10, 2005 | Anderson Mesa | LONEOS | · | 3.4 km | MPC · JPL |
| 171222 | 2005 JK_{125} | — | May 11, 2005 | Catalina | CSS | · | 3.5 km | MPC · JPL |
| 171223 | 2005 JY_{132} | — | May 14, 2005 | Kitt Peak | Spacewatch | · | 3.2 km | MPC · JPL |
| 171224 | 2005 JD_{136} | — | May 11, 2005 | Catalina | CSS | EOS | 3.1 km | MPC · JPL |
| 171225 | 2005 JR_{138} | — | May 13, 2005 | Mount Lemmon | Mount Lemmon Survey | · | 2.9 km | MPC · JPL |
| 171226 | 2005 JR_{142} | — | May 15, 2005 | Palomar | NEAT | · | 2.5 km | MPC · JPL |
| 171227 | 2005 JS_{151} | — | May 4, 2005 | Mount Lemmon | Mount Lemmon Survey | (11882) | 2.4 km | MPC · JPL |
| 171228 | 2005 JO_{153} | — | May 4, 2005 | Catalina | CSS | PHO | 1.6 km | MPC · JPL |
| 171229 | 2005 JZ_{154} | — | May 4, 2005 | Mount Lemmon | Mount Lemmon Survey | · | 1.9 km | MPC · JPL |
| 171230 | 2005 JB_{160} | — | May 7, 2005 | Mount Lemmon | Mount Lemmon Survey | AGN | 1.7 km | MPC · JPL |
| 171231 | 2005 JC_{160} | — | May 7, 2005 | Mount Lemmon | Mount Lemmon Survey | · | 2.4 km | MPC · JPL |
| 171232 | 2005 JK_{160} | — | May 7, 2005 | Mount Lemmon | Mount Lemmon Survey | · | 2.8 km | MPC · JPL |
| 171233 | 2005 JU_{163} | — | May 9, 2005 | Kitt Peak | Spacewatch | · | 2.7 km | MPC · JPL |
| 171234 | 2005 JO_{165} | — | May 10, 2005 | Kitt Peak | Spacewatch | · | 4.7 km | MPC · JPL |
| 171235 | 2005 JZ_{165} | — | May 11, 2005 | Mount Lemmon | Mount Lemmon Survey | KOR | 1.9 km | MPC · JPL |
| 171236 | 2005 JR_{177} | — | May 8, 2005 | Kitt Peak | Spacewatch | · | 3.4 km | MPC · JPL |
| 171237 | 2005 JZ_{177} | — | May 9, 2005 | Anderson Mesa | LONEOS | HYG | 3.9 km | MPC · JPL |
| 171238 | 2005 KR_{7} | — | May 19, 2005 | Mount Lemmon | Mount Lemmon Survey | TIR | 3.0 km | MPC · JPL |
| 171239 | 2005 KO_{10} | — | May 29, 2005 | Siding Spring | SSS | EOS | 3.9 km | MPC · JPL |
| 171240 | 2005 KA_{11} | — | May 31, 2005 | Reedy Creek | J. Broughton | · | 3.4 km | MPC · JPL |
| 171241 | 2005 KY_{11} | — | May 30, 2005 | Junk Bond | Junk Bond | · | 6.8 km | MPC · JPL |
| 171242 | 2005 LJ_{5} | — | June 2, 2005 | Catalina | CSS | · | 5.8 km | MPC · JPL |
| 171243 | 2005 LP_{8} | — | June 5, 2005 | Reedy Creek | J. Broughton | · | 3.2 km | MPC · JPL |
| 171244 | 2005 LT_{8} | — | June 1, 2005 | Kitt Peak | Spacewatch | THM | 4.5 km | MPC · JPL |
| 171245 | 2005 LF_{9} | — | June 1, 2005 | Kitt Peak | Spacewatch | EOS | 2.4 km | MPC · JPL |
| 171246 | 2005 LD_{36} | — | June 13, 2005 | Mount Lemmon | Mount Lemmon Survey | · | 1.9 km | MPC · JPL |
| 171247 | 2005 LJ_{38} | — | June 11, 2005 | Kitt Peak | Spacewatch | · | 5.1 km | MPC · JPL |
| 171248 | 2005 LC_{49} | — | June 10, 2005 | Kitt Peak | Spacewatch | · | 3.9 km | MPC · JPL |
| 171249 | 2005 MV_{1} | — | June 19, 2005 | Socorro | LINEAR | · | 4.5 km | MPC · JPL |
| 171250 | 2005 MU_{14} | — | June 29, 2005 | Palomar | NEAT | EOS | 3.4 km | MPC · JPL |
| 171251 | 2005 MU_{35} | — | June 30, 2005 | Kitt Peak | Spacewatch | EOS | 3.2 km | MPC · JPL |
| 171252 | 2005 MF_{53} | — | June 29, 2005 | Palomar | NEAT | EOS | 3.0 km | MPC · JPL |
| 171253 | 2005 NJ_{12} | — | July 4, 2005 | Mount Lemmon | Mount Lemmon Survey | L4 | 10 km | MPC · JPL |
| 171254 | 2005 NH_{56} | — | July 5, 2005 | Palomar | NEAT | · | 3.4 km | MPC · JPL |
| 171255 | 2005 NX_{89} | — | July 4, 2005 | Mount Lemmon | Mount Lemmon Survey | · | 4.8 km | MPC · JPL |
| 171256 Lucieconstant | 2005 PU_{5} | Lucieconstant | August 8, 2005 | Saint-Sulpice | B. Christophe | · | 3.7 km | MPC · JPL |
| 171257 | 2005 QP_{77} | — | August 25, 2005 | Palomar | NEAT | THM | 4.2 km | MPC · JPL |
| 171258 | 2005 QW_{84} | — | August 30, 2005 | Socorro | LINEAR | 3:2 | 8.9 km | MPC · JPL |
| 171259 | 2006 BM_{103} | — | January 23, 2006 | Mount Lemmon | Mount Lemmon Survey | · | 1.6 km | MPC · JPL |
| 171260 | 2006 BN_{132} | — | January 26, 2006 | Kitt Peak | Spacewatch | · | 1.2 km | MPC · JPL |
| 171261 | 2006 DA_{33} | — | February 20, 2006 | Kitt Peak | Spacewatch | · | 1.0 km | MPC · JPL |
| 171262 | 2006 DA_{80} | — | February 24, 2006 | Kitt Peak | Spacewatch | (1338) (FLO) | 870 m | MPC · JPL |
| 171263 | 2006 DV_{84} | — | February 24, 2006 | Kitt Peak | Spacewatch | · | 1.6 km | MPC · JPL |
| 171264 | 2006 DJ_{92} | — | February 24, 2006 | Mount Lemmon | Mount Lemmon Survey | · | 970 m | MPC · JPL |
| 171265 | 2006 DQ_{107} | — | February 25, 2006 | Kitt Peak | Spacewatch | · | 1.0 km | MPC · JPL |
| 171266 | 2006 DU_{115} | — | February 27, 2006 | Kitt Peak | Spacewatch | · | 1.3 km | MPC · JPL |
| 171267 | 2006 DQ_{126} | — | February 25, 2006 | Kitt Peak | Spacewatch | · | 1.3 km | MPC · JPL |
| 171268 | 2006 DD_{185} | — | February 27, 2006 | Mount Lemmon | Mount Lemmon Survey | · | 1.0 km | MPC · JPL |
| 171269 | 2006 DX_{189} | — | February 27, 2006 | Mount Lemmon | Mount Lemmon Survey | · | 1.0 km | MPC · JPL |
| 171270 | 2006 DP_{192} | — | February 27, 2006 | Kitt Peak | Spacewatch | · | 1.1 km | MPC · JPL |
| 171271 | 2006 EU_{6} | — | March 2, 2006 | Kitt Peak | Spacewatch | · | 1.5 km | MPC · JPL |
| 171272 | 2006 ED_{47} | — | March 4, 2006 | Kitt Peak | Spacewatch | · | 890 m | MPC · JPL |
| 171273 | 2006 FR | — | March 22, 2006 | Catalina | CSS | · | 1.5 km | MPC · JPL |
| 171274 | 2006 FR_{2} | — | March 23, 2006 | Kitt Peak | Spacewatch | · | 1.8 km | MPC · JPL |
| 171275 | 2006 FE_{4} | — | March 23, 2006 | Kitt Peak | Spacewatch | · | 1.1 km | MPC · JPL |
| 171276 | 2006 FP_{12} | — | March 23, 2006 | Kitt Peak | Spacewatch | · | 1.9 km | MPC · JPL |
| 171277 | 2006 FF_{23} | — | March 24, 2006 | Kitt Peak | Spacewatch | · | 1.7 km | MPC · JPL |
| 171278 | 2006 FS_{27} | — | March 24, 2006 | Mount Lemmon | Mount Lemmon Survey | · | 2.7 km | MPC · JPL |
| 171279 | 2006 FV_{29} | — | March 24, 2006 | Mount Lemmon | Mount Lemmon Survey | · | 1.0 km | MPC · JPL |
| 171280 | 2006 FY_{34} | — | March 24, 2006 | Kitt Peak | Spacewatch | H | 920 m | MPC · JPL |
| 171281 | 2006 FJ_{36} | — | March 24, 2006 | Socorro | LINEAR | · | 1.3 km | MPC · JPL |
| 171282 | 2006 FK_{41} | — | March 26, 2006 | Mount Lemmon | Mount Lemmon Survey | · | 1.2 km | MPC · JPL |
| 171283 | 2006 FK_{47} | — | March 23, 2006 | Catalina | CSS | · | 1.4 km | MPC · JPL |
| 171284 | 2006 FL_{47} | — | March 24, 2006 | Anderson Mesa | LONEOS | · | 1.8 km | MPC · JPL |
| 171285 | 2006 FM_{49} | — | March 25, 2006 | Anderson Mesa | LONEOS | H | 740 m | MPC · JPL |
| 171286 | 2006 FF_{51} | — | March 30, 2006 | Socorro | LINEAR | · | 2.7 km | MPC · JPL |
| 171287 | 2006 GK_{3} | — | April 7, 2006 | Wrightwood | J. W. Young | · | 1.6 km | MPC · JPL |
| 171288 | 2006 GY_{21} | — | April 2, 2006 | Kitt Peak | Spacewatch | · | 1.9 km | MPC · JPL |
| 171289 | 2006 GE_{31} | — | April 2, 2006 | Kitt Peak | Spacewatch | · | 1.2 km | MPC · JPL |
| 171290 | 2006 GA_{32} | — | April 6, 2006 | Catalina | CSS | · | 1.0 km | MPC · JPL |
| 171291 | 2006 GH_{35} | — | April 7, 2006 | Socorro | LINEAR | · | 2.0 km | MPC · JPL |
| 171292 | 2006 GS_{38} | — | April 6, 2006 | Catalina | CSS | · | 1.2 km | MPC · JPL |
| 171293 | 2006 GV_{38} | — | April 6, 2006 | Siding Spring | SSS | · | 1.5 km | MPC · JPL |
| 171294 | 2006 GX_{38} | — | April 7, 2006 | Catalina | CSS | NYS | 1.6 km | MPC · JPL |
| 171295 | 2006 HD_{1} | — | April 18, 2006 | Anderson Mesa | LONEOS | · | 5.0 km | MPC · JPL |
| 171296 | 2006 HN_{1} | — | April 18, 2006 | Catalina | CSS | · | 1.2 km | MPC · JPL |
| 171297 | 2006 HX_{2} | — | April 18, 2006 | Kitt Peak | Spacewatch | · | 2.8 km | MPC · JPL |
| 171298 | 2006 HV_{3} | — | April 18, 2006 | Kitt Peak | Spacewatch | · | 1.8 km | MPC · JPL |
| 171299 | 2006 HK_{6} | — | April 18, 2006 | Anderson Mesa | LONEOS | · | 1.4 km | MPC · JPL |
| 171300 | 2006 HV_{7} | — | April 20, 2006 | RAS | Lowe, A. | H | 950 m | MPC · JPL |

== 171301–171400 ==
back to top

| Designation | | | Discovery | | | Properties | | Ref |
| Permanent | Provisional | Named after | Date | Site | Discoverer(s) | Category | Diam. | Ref |
|---|---|---|---|---|---|---|---|---|
| 171301 | 2006 HS_{13} | — | April 19, 2006 | Kitt Peak | Spacewatch | · | 1.6 km | MPC · JPL |
| 171302 | 2006 HQ_{23} | — | April 20, 2006 | Kitt Peak | Spacewatch | · | 2.8 km | MPC · JPL |
| 171303 | 2006 HE_{29} | — | April 21, 2006 | Mount Lemmon | Mount Lemmon Survey | NYS | 1.6 km | MPC · JPL |
| 171304 | 2006 HH_{30} | — | April 19, 2006 | Catalina | CSS | JUN | 1.9 km | MPC · JPL |
| 171305 | 2006 HJ_{30} | — | April 19, 2006 | Catalina | CSS | · | 2.0 km | MPC · JPL |
| 171306 | 2006 HP_{34} | — | April 19, 2006 | Catalina | CSS | · | 1.4 km | MPC · JPL |
| 171307 | 2006 HJ_{35} | — | April 19, 2006 | Mount Lemmon | Mount Lemmon Survey | · | 1.9 km | MPC · JPL |
| 171308 | 2006 HE_{38} | — | April 21, 2006 | Kitt Peak | Spacewatch | · | 2.9 km | MPC · JPL |
| 171309 | 2006 HG_{42} | — | April 21, 2006 | Siding Spring | SSS | · | 1.2 km | MPC · JPL |
| 171310 | 2006 HN_{43} | — | April 24, 2006 | Socorro | LINEAR | PHO | 1.6 km | MPC · JPL |
| 171311 | 2006 HM_{44} | — | April 24, 2006 | Mount Lemmon | Mount Lemmon Survey | · | 840 m | MPC · JPL |
| 171312 | 2006 HS_{46} | — | April 20, 2006 | Kitt Peak | Spacewatch | V | 950 m | MPC · JPL |
| 171313 | 2006 HB_{48} | — | April 24, 2006 | Kitt Peak | Spacewatch | BAP | 1.2 km | MPC · JPL |
| 171314 | 2006 HL_{51} | — | April 24, 2006 | Reedy Creek | J. Broughton | · | 1.7 km | MPC · JPL |
| 171315 | 2006 HD_{52} | — | April 27, 2006 | RAS | Lowe, A. | · | 1.8 km | MPC · JPL |
| 171316 | 2006 HK_{54} | — | April 20, 2006 | Catalina | CSS | NYS | 1.6 km | MPC · JPL |
| 171317 | 2006 HQ_{63} | — | April 24, 2006 | Kitt Peak | Spacewatch | · | 770 m | MPC · JPL |
| 171318 | 2006 HW_{67} | — | April 24, 2006 | Mount Lemmon | Mount Lemmon Survey | NYS · | 1.7 km | MPC · JPL |
| 171319 | 2006 HJ_{75} | — | April 25, 2006 | Kitt Peak | Spacewatch | · | 1.1 km | MPC · JPL |
| 171320 | 2006 HO_{78} | — | April 26, 2006 | Mount Lemmon | Mount Lemmon Survey | · | 1.5 km | MPC · JPL |
| 171321 | 2006 HR_{80} | — | April 26, 2006 | Kitt Peak | Spacewatch | MAS | 840 m | MPC · JPL |
| 171322 | 2006 HY_{90} | — | April 29, 2006 | Kitt Peak | Spacewatch | · | 1.5 km | MPC · JPL |
| 171323 | 2006 HD_{91} | — | April 29, 2006 | Kitt Peak | Spacewatch | HOF | 3.4 km | MPC · JPL |
| 171324 | 2006 HQ_{96} | — | April 30, 2006 | Kitt Peak | Spacewatch | · | 1.6 km | MPC · JPL |
| 171325 | 2006 HD_{101} | — | April 30, 2006 | Kitt Peak | Spacewatch | · | 2.3 km | MPC · JPL |
| 171326 | 2006 JA_{1} | — | May 3, 2006 | Reedy Creek | J. Broughton | · | 2.6 km | MPC · JPL |
| 171327 | 2006 JF_{10} | — | May 1, 2006 | Kitt Peak | Spacewatch | · | 880 m | MPC · JPL |
| 171328 | 2006 JS_{17} | — | May 2, 2006 | Mount Lemmon | Mount Lemmon Survey | · | 1.7 km | MPC · JPL |
| 171329 | 2006 JM_{27} | — | May 1, 2006 | Socorro | LINEAR | · | 2.1 km | MPC · JPL |
| 171330 | 2006 JQ_{37} | — | May 5, 2006 | Kitt Peak | Spacewatch | RAF | 1.9 km | MPC · JPL |
| 171331 | 2006 JU_{39} | — | May 6, 2006 | Mount Lemmon | Mount Lemmon Survey | V | 1.2 km | MPC · JPL |
| 171332 | 2006 JR_{45} | — | May 8, 2006 | Mount Lemmon | Mount Lemmon Survey | · | 3.3 km | MPC · JPL |
| 171333 | 2006 JE_{46} | — | May 10, 2006 | Mount Lemmon | Mount Lemmon Survey | · | 1.8 km | MPC · JPL |
| 171334 | 2006 JB_{47} | — | May 9, 2006 | Kitt Peak | Spacewatch | · | 1.6 km | MPC · JPL |
| 171335 | 2006 JE_{48} | — | May 5, 2006 | Kitt Peak | Spacewatch | V | 990 m | MPC · JPL |
| 171336 | 2006 JT_{54} | — | May 8, 2006 | Mount Lemmon | Mount Lemmon Survey | · | 1.4 km | MPC · JPL |
| 171337 | 2006 JE_{59} | — | May 1, 2006 | Kitt Peak | M. W. Buie | MAS | 870 m | MPC · JPL |
| 171338 | 2006 JZ_{60} | — | May 2, 2006 | Kitt Peak | M. W. Buie | MAS | 1.1 km | MPC · JPL |
| 171339 | 2006 KM_{2} | — | May 18, 2006 | Palomar | NEAT | · | 1.6 km | MPC · JPL |
| 171340 | 2006 KG_{4} | — | May 19, 2006 | Catalina | CSS | · | 1.7 km | MPC · JPL |
| 171341 | 2006 KP_{4} | — | May 19, 2006 | Mount Lemmon | Mount Lemmon Survey | · | 1.8 km | MPC · JPL |
| 171342 | 2006 KY_{9} | — | May 19, 2006 | Catalina | CSS | · | 2.5 km | MPC · JPL |
| 171343 | 2006 KN_{10} | — | May 19, 2006 | Mount Lemmon | Mount Lemmon Survey | · | 3.0 km | MPC · JPL |
| 171344 | 2006 KA_{15} | — | May 20, 2006 | Catalina | CSS | EUN | 1.7 km | MPC · JPL |
| 171345 | 2006 KH_{21} | — | May 21, 2006 | Siding Spring | SSS | · | 2.1 km | MPC · JPL |
| 171346 | 2006 KP_{23} | — | May 16, 2006 | Siding Spring | SSS | · | 1.1 km | MPC · JPL |
| 171347 | 2006 KU_{23} | — | May 18, 2006 | Siding Spring | SSS | · | 1.2 km | MPC · JPL |
| 171348 | 2006 KU_{27} | — | May 20, 2006 | Kitt Peak | Spacewatch | · | 1.7 km | MPC · JPL |
| 171349 | 2006 KT_{42} | — | May 20, 2006 | Kitt Peak | Spacewatch | · | 1.4 km | MPC · JPL |
| 171350 | 2006 KA_{46} | — | May 21, 2006 | Mount Lemmon | Mount Lemmon Survey | · | 2.7 km | MPC · JPL |
| 171351 | 2006 KD_{61} | — | May 22, 2006 | Kitt Peak | Spacewatch | · | 5.4 km | MPC · JPL |
| 171352 | 2006 KB_{65} | — | May 23, 2006 | Mount Lemmon | Mount Lemmon Survey | · | 2.8 km | MPC · JPL |
| 171353 | 2006 KR_{65} | — | May 24, 2006 | Kitt Peak | Spacewatch | V | 870 m | MPC · JPL |
| 171354 | 2006 KU_{65} | — | May 24, 2006 | Kitt Peak | Spacewatch | EUN | 1.8 km | MPC · JPL |
| 171355 | 2006 KT_{68} | — | May 20, 2006 | Catalina | CSS | EUN | 1.7 km | MPC · JPL |
| 171356 | 2006 KV_{73} | — | May 23, 2006 | Kitt Peak | Spacewatch | · | 2.5 km | MPC · JPL |
| 171357 | 2006 KA_{83} | — | May 19, 2006 | Palomar | NEAT | · | 1.8 km | MPC · JPL |
| 171358 | 2006 KT_{85} | — | May 20, 2006 | Siding Spring | SSS | EUN | 2.8 km | MPC · JPL |
| 171359 | 2006 KU_{104} | — | May 28, 2006 | Kitt Peak | Spacewatch | AGN | 1.5 km | MPC · JPL |
| 171360 | 2006 KE_{107} | — | May 31, 2006 | Mount Lemmon | Mount Lemmon Survey | · | 1.6 km | MPC · JPL |
| 171361 | 2006 KN_{108} | — | May 31, 2006 | Mount Lemmon | Mount Lemmon Survey | · | 1.7 km | MPC · JPL |
| 171362 | 2006 KV_{110} | — | May 31, 2006 | Mount Lemmon | Mount Lemmon Survey | · | 1.7 km | MPC · JPL |
| 171363 | 2006 KT_{121} | — | May 28, 2006 | Siding Spring | SSS | EUN | 2.2 km | MPC · JPL |
| 171364 | 2006 LG_{1} | — | June 1, 2006 | Kitt Peak | Spacewatch | · | 4.8 km | MPC · JPL |
| 171365 | 2006 LS_{1} | — | June 5, 2006 | Socorro | LINEAR | · | 2.2 km | MPC · JPL |
| 171366 | 2006 LE_{2} | — | June 7, 2006 | Siding Spring | SSS | · | 2.5 km | MPC · JPL |
| 171367 | 2006 LW_{3} | — | June 15, 2006 | Kitt Peak | Spacewatch | · | 1.5 km | MPC · JPL |
| 171368 | 2006 LV_{4} | — | June 7, 2006 | Siding Spring | SSS | · | 4.7 km | MPC · JPL |
| 171369 | 2006 LW_{5} | — | June 4, 2006 | Mount Lemmon | Mount Lemmon Survey | · | 3.4 km | MPC · JPL |
| 171370 | 2006 LX_{5} | — | June 3, 2006 | Mount Lemmon | Mount Lemmon Survey | · | 4.6 km | MPC · JPL |
| 171371 | 2006 LE_{7} | — | June 10, 2006 | Palomar | NEAT | · | 5.3 km | MPC · JPL |
| 171372 | 2006 MK_{3} | — | June 19, 2006 | Mount Lemmon | Mount Lemmon Survey | HYG | 4.9 km | MPC · JPL |
| 171373 | 2006 MN_{14} | — | June 28, 2006 | Siding Spring | SSS | PHO | 2.6 km | MPC · JPL |
| 171374 | 2006 NE | — | July 1, 2006 | Reedy Creek | J. Broughton | · | 4.1 km | MPC · JPL |
| 171375 | 2006 OH | — | July 17, 2006 | Eskridge | Farpoint | · | 3.9 km | MPC · JPL |
| 171376 | 2006 OM | — | July 17, 2006 | Vicques | M. Ory | EOS | 2.2 km | MPC · JPL |
| 171377 | 2006 OR_{8} | — | July 20, 2006 | Palomar | NEAT | VER | 4.2 km | MPC · JPL |
| 171378 | 2006 OV_{8} | — | July 20, 2006 | Palomar | NEAT | MAS | 1.6 km | MPC · JPL |
| 171379 | 2006 OL_{9} | — | July 24, 2006 | Hibiscus | S. F. Hönig | EOS | 4.1 km | MPC · JPL |
| 171380 | 2006 OM_{12} | — | July 18, 2006 | Siding Spring | SSS | · | 2.7 km | MPC · JPL |
| 171381 Taipei | 2006 OG_{17} | Taipei | July 22, 2006 | Lulin Observatory | Lin, H.-C., Q. Ye | EOS | 2.7 km | MPC · JPL |
| 171382 | 2006 OO_{17} | — | July 18, 2006 | Siding Spring | SSS | · | 3.0 km | MPC · JPL |
| 171383 | 2006 OE_{20} | — | July 18, 2006 | Siding Spring | SSS | EOS | 3.0 km | MPC · JPL |
| 171384 | 2006 PY_{6} | — | August 12, 2006 | Palomar | NEAT | · | 3.0 km | MPC · JPL |
| 171385 | 2006 PW_{7} | — | August 12, 2006 | Palomar | NEAT | · | 2.2 km | MPC · JPL |
| 171386 | 2006 PP_{9} | — | August 13, 2006 | Palomar | NEAT | · | 4.3 km | MPC · JPL |
| 171387 | 2006 PR_{9} | — | August 13, 2006 | Palomar | NEAT | MAS | 1.2 km | MPC · JPL |
| 171388 | 2006 PL_{10} | — | August 13, 2006 | Palomar | NEAT | NEM | 3.4 km | MPC · JPL |
| 171389 | 2006 PV_{12} | — | August 13, 2006 | Palomar | NEAT | · | 3.2 km | MPC · JPL |
| 171390 | 2006 PK_{13} | — | August 14, 2006 | Siding Spring | SSS | · | 7.1 km | MPC · JPL |
| 171391 | 2006 PK_{27} | — | August 13, 2006 | Siding Spring | SSS | T_{j} (2.99) · EUP | 5.5 km | MPC · JPL |
| 171392 | 2006 PX_{29} | — | August 12, 2006 | Palomar | NEAT | · | 2.6 km | MPC · JPL |
| 171393 | 2006 PH_{32} | — | August 15, 2006 | Palomar | NEAT | · | 5.8 km | MPC · JPL |
| 171394 | 2006 PD_{39} | — | August 14, 2006 | Palomar | NEAT | · | 4.1 km | MPC · JPL |
| 171395 | 2006 QN_{27} | — | August 20, 2006 | Kitt Peak | Spacewatch | · | 1.3 km | MPC · JPL |
| 171396 Miguel | 2006 QH_{33} | Miguel | August 24, 2006 | La Cañada | Lacruz, J. | · | 1.8 km | MPC · JPL |
| 171397 | 2006 QT_{40} | — | August 16, 2006 | Siding Spring | SSS | EOS | 3.3 km | MPC · JPL |
| 171398 | 2006 QH_{42} | — | August 17, 2006 | Palomar | NEAT | CYB | 5.7 km | MPC · JPL |
| 171399 | 2006 QL_{66} | — | August 21, 2006 | Socorro | LINEAR | · | 2.9 km | MPC · JPL |
| 171400 | 2006 QZ_{98} | — | August 22, 2006 | Palomar | NEAT | · | 2.9 km | MPC · JPL |

== 171401–171500 ==
back to top

| Designation | | | Discovery | | | Properties | | Ref |
| Permanent | Provisional | Named after | Date | Site | Discoverer(s) | Category | Diam. | Ref |
|---|---|---|---|---|---|---|---|---|
| 171401 | 2006 QC_{129} | — | August 17, 2006 | Palomar | NEAT | · | 6.8 km | MPC · JPL |
| 171402 | 2006 QL_{133} | — | August 23, 2006 | Siding Spring | SSS | · | 5.3 km | MPC · JPL |
| 171403 | 2006 QV_{136} | — | August 16, 2006 | Palomar | NEAT | · | 3.5 km | MPC · JPL |
| 171404 | 2006 QR_{141} | — | August 18, 2006 | Palomar | NEAT | HOF | 3.9 km | MPC · JPL |
| 171405 | 2006 QS_{144} | — | August 28, 2006 | Socorro | LINEAR | · | 2.9 km | MPC · JPL |
| 171406 | 2006 QV_{145} | — | August 18, 2006 | Kitt Peak | Spacewatch | · | 2.8 km | MPC · JPL |
| 171407 | 2006 QV_{148} | — | August 18, 2006 | Kitt Peak | Spacewatch | KOR | 2.1 km | MPC · JPL |
| 171408 | 2006 QF_{150} | — | August 19, 2006 | Kitt Peak | Spacewatch | · | 2.2 km | MPC · JPL |
| 171409 | 2006 QV_{162} | — | August 21, 2006 | Kitt Peak | Spacewatch | V | 1.0 km | MPC · JPL |
| 171410 | 2006 QZ_{167} | — | August 30, 2006 | Anderson Mesa | LONEOS | · | 4.6 km | MPC · JPL |
| 171411 | 2006 RO_{3} | — | September 11, 2006 | Catalina | CSS | TIR | 4.7 km | MPC · JPL |
| 171412 | 2006 RS_{35} | — | September 14, 2006 | Palomar | NEAT | · | 2.5 km | MPC · JPL |
| 171413 | 2006 RK_{50} | — | September 14, 2006 | Kitt Peak | Spacewatch | · | 4.1 km | MPC · JPL |
| 171414 | 2006 RJ_{91} | — | September 15, 2006 | Kitt Peak | Spacewatch | CYB | 3.6 km | MPC · JPL |
| 171415 | 2006 RV_{99} | — | September 14, 2006 | Palomar | NEAT | · | 2.0 km | MPC · JPL |
| 171416 | 2006 SL_{11} | — | September 16, 2006 | Socorro | LINEAR | · | 3.6 km | MPC · JPL |
| 171417 | 2006 SS_{153} | — | September 20, 2006 | Catalina | CSS | VER | 3.9 km | MPC · JPL |
| 171418 | 2006 TH_{2} | — | October 2, 2006 | Mount Lemmon | Mount Lemmon Survey | · | 4.5 km | MPC · JPL |
| 171419 | 2006 UH_{107} | — | October 18, 2006 | Kitt Peak | Spacewatch | · | 1.5 km | MPC · JPL |
| 171420 | 2006 VX_{28} | — | November 10, 2006 | Kitt Peak | Spacewatch | 3:2 | 13 km | MPC · JPL |
| 171421 | 2007 AG_{11} | — | January 14, 2007 | Altschwendt | W. Ries | · | 4.6 km | MPC · JPL |
| 171422 | 2007 EL_{14} | — | March 9, 2007 | Kitt Peak | Spacewatch | · | 1.4 km | MPC · JPL |
| 171423 | 2007 MQ_{19} | — | June 21, 2007 | Mount Lemmon | Mount Lemmon Survey | · | 2.2 km | MPC · JPL |
| 171424 Rudyfernández | 2007 NL_{2} | Rudyfernández | July 13, 2007 | OAM | OAM | L4 | 20 km | MPC · JPL |
| 171425 | 2007 PC_{17} | — | August 8, 2007 | Socorro | LINEAR | NYS | 1.9 km | MPC · JPL |
| 171426 | 2007 PP_{18} | — | August 9, 2007 | Socorro | LINEAR | · | 4.3 km | MPC · JPL |
| 171427 | 2007 PB_{21} | — | August 9, 2007 | Socorro | LINEAR | · | 2.7 km | MPC · JPL |
| 171428 | 2007 PA_{26} | — | August 9, 2007 | Socorro | LINEAR | NYS | 1.7 km | MPC · JPL |
| 171429 Hunstead | 2007 RD_{5} | Hunstead | September 1, 2007 | Siding Spring | K. Sárneczky, L. Kiss | · | 5.6 km | MPC · JPL |
| 171430 | 2007 RX_{10} | — | September 9, 2007 | Palomar | Palomar | · | 1.5 km | MPC · JPL |
| 171431 | 2007 RC_{19} | — | September 13, 2007 | Chante-Perdrix | Chante-Perdrix | · | 3.8 km | MPC · JPL |
| 171432 | 2007 RK_{19} | — | September 5, 2007 | Bergisch Gladbach | W. Bickel | · | 1.4 km | MPC · JPL |
| 171433 Prothous | 2007 RK_{35} | Prothous | September 7, 2007 | La Cañada | Lacruz, J. | L4 | 13 km | MPC · JPL |
| 171434 | 2007 RO_{38} | — | September 8, 2007 | Anderson Mesa | LONEOS | NYS | 1.8 km | MPC · JPL |
| 171435 | 2007 RW_{67} | — | September 10, 2007 | Kitt Peak | Spacewatch | · | 2.1 km | MPC · JPL |
| 171436 | 2007 RF_{72} | — | September 10, 2007 | Kitt Peak | Spacewatch | · | 5.0 km | MPC · JPL |
| 171437 | 2007 RO_{83} | — | September 10, 2007 | Kitt Peak | Spacewatch | · | 2.6 km | MPC · JPL |
| 171438 | 2007 RG_{84} | — | September 10, 2007 | Kitt Peak | Spacewatch | fast | 4.8 km | MPC · JPL |
| 171439 | 2007 RO_{89} | — | September 10, 2007 | Mount Lemmon | Mount Lemmon Survey | NYS | 1.6 km | MPC · JPL |
| 171440 | 2007 RT_{101} | — | September 11, 2007 | Mount Lemmon | Mount Lemmon Survey | · | 2.0 km | MPC · JPL |
| 171441 | 2007 RC_{106} | — | September 11, 2007 | Catalina | CSS | · | 2.6 km | MPC · JPL |
| 171442 | 2007 RU_{112} | — | September 11, 2007 | Kitt Peak | Spacewatch | · | 1.0 km | MPC · JPL |
| 171443 | 2007 RQ_{140} | — | September 13, 2007 | Socorro | LINEAR | · | 2.5 km | MPC · JPL |
| 171444 | 2007 RL_{141} | — | September 13, 2007 | Socorro | LINEAR | · | 2.4 km | MPC · JPL |
| 171445 | 2007 RT_{141} | — | September 13, 2007 | Socorro | LINEAR | NYS | 1.8 km | MPC · JPL |
| 171446 | 2007 RL_{142} | — | September 13, 2007 | Socorro | LINEAR | · | 2.0 km | MPC · JPL |
| 171447 | 2007 RO_{145} | — | September 14, 2007 | Socorro | LINEAR | · | 4.5 km | MPC · JPL |
| 171448 Guchaohao | 2007 RD_{147} | Guchaohao | September 11, 2007 | Purple Mountain | PMO NEO Survey Program | · | 900 m | MPC · JPL |
| 171449 | 2007 RE_{223} | — | September 12, 2007 | Anderson Mesa | LONEOS | EUN | 2.0 km | MPC · JPL |
| 171450 | 2007 RO_{276} | — | September 5, 2007 | Catalina | CSS | · | 3.2 km | MPC · JPL |
| 171451 | 2007 SR_{7} | — | September 18, 2007 | Kitt Peak | Spacewatch | · | 2.0 km | MPC · JPL |
| 171452 | 2007 SZ_{13} | — | September 20, 2007 | Catalina | CSS | · | 2.5 km | MPC · JPL |
| 171453 | 2007 SH_{15} | — | September 25, 2007 | Mount Lemmon | Mount Lemmon Survey | MAS | 1.1 km | MPC · JPL |
| 171454 | 2007 SM_{17} | — | September 18, 2007 | Anderson Mesa | LONEOS | · | 2.3 km | MPC · JPL |
| 171455 | 2007 TR | — | October 3, 2007 | RAS | Lowe, A. | · | 3.5 km | MPC · JPL |
| 171456 | 2007 TU_{11} | — | October 6, 2007 | Socorro | LINEAR | · | 1.4 km | MPC · JPL |
| 171457 | 2007 TS_{12} | — | October 6, 2007 | Socorro | LINEAR | · | 4.1 km | MPC · JPL |
| 171458 Pepaprats | 2007 TF_{14} | Pepaprats | October 7, 2007 | OAM | OAM | NYS | 1.5 km | MPC · JPL |
| 171459 | 2007 TN_{176} | — | October 5, 2007 | Hibiscus | Hibiscus | · | 2.3 km | MPC · JPL |
| 171460 | 2170 P-L | — | September 24, 1960 | Palomar | C. J. van Houten, I. van Houten-Groeneveld, T. Gehrels | · | 1.6 km | MPC · JPL |
| 171461 | 2666 P-L | — | September 24, 1960 | Palomar | C. J. van Houten, I. van Houten-Groeneveld, T. Gehrels | · | 2.0 km | MPC · JPL |
| 171462 | 4518 P-L | — | September 24, 1960 | Palomar | C. J. van Houten, I. van Houten-Groeneveld, T. Gehrels | · | 900 m | MPC · JPL |
| 171463 | 6272 P-L | — | September 24, 1960 | Palomar | C. J. van Houten, I. van Houten-Groeneveld, T. Gehrels | · | 4.2 km | MPC · JPL |
| 171464 | 6731 P-L | — | September 24, 1960 | Palomar | C. J. van Houten, I. van Houten-Groeneveld, T. Gehrels | · | 1.8 km | MPC · JPL |
| 171465 Evamaria | 6847 P-L | Evamaria | September 24, 1960 | Palomar | C. J. van Houten, I. van Houten-Groeneveld, T. Gehrels | T_{j} (2.99) · 3:2 | 7.3 km | MPC · JPL |
| 171466 | 6862 P-L | — | September 24, 1960 | Palomar | C. J. van Houten, I. van Houten-Groeneveld, T. Gehrels | · | 850 m | MPC · JPL |
| 171467 | 2040 T-1 | — | March 25, 1971 | Palomar | C. J. van Houten, I. van Houten-Groeneveld, T. Gehrels | · | 2.4 km | MPC · JPL |
| 171468 | 2252 T-1 | — | March 25, 1971 | Palomar | C. J. van Houten, I. van Houten-Groeneveld, T. Gehrels | NYS | 2.0 km | MPC · JPL |
| 171469 | 1103 T-2 | — | September 29, 1973 | Palomar | C. J. van Houten, I. van Houten-Groeneveld, T. Gehrels | EOS | 3.2 km | MPC · JPL |
| 171470 | 1275 T-2 | — | September 29, 1973 | Palomar | C. J. van Houten, I. van Houten-Groeneveld, T. Gehrels | · | 2.9 km | MPC · JPL |
| 171471 | 2112 T-3 | — | October 16, 1977 | Palomar | C. J. van Houten, I. van Houten-Groeneveld, T. Gehrels | · | 1.9 km | MPC · JPL |
| 171472 | 2195 T-3 | — | October 16, 1977 | Palomar | C. J. van Houten, I. van Houten-Groeneveld, T. Gehrels | · | 2.2 km | MPC · JPL |
| 171473 | 3182 T-3 | — | October 16, 1977 | Palomar | C. J. van Houten, I. van Houten-Groeneveld, T. Gehrels | · | 1.7 km | MPC · JPL |
| 171474 | 5064 T-3 | — | October 16, 1977 | Palomar | C. J. van Houten, I. van Houten-Groeneveld, T. Gehrels | V | 1.0 km | MPC · JPL |
| 171475 | 5151 T-3 | — | October 16, 1977 | Palomar | C. J. van Houten, I. van Houten-Groeneveld, T. Gehrels | · | 2.1 km | MPC · JPL |
| 171476 | 1993 RT_{4} | — | September 15, 1993 | La Silla | E. W. Elst | · | 1.7 km | MPC · JPL |
| 171477 | 1993 YL_{1} | — | December 16, 1993 | Kitt Peak | Spacewatch | GEF | 1.8 km | MPC · JPL |
| 171478 | 1994 EG_{5} | — | March 7, 1994 | Kitt Peak | Spacewatch | · | 1.8 km | MPC · JPL |
| 171479 | 1994 GP_{4} | — | April 6, 1994 | Kitt Peak | Spacewatch | · | 1.6 km | MPC · JPL |
| 171480 | 1995 EW_{3} | — | March 2, 1995 | Kitt Peak | Spacewatch | · | 900 m | MPC · JPL |
| 171481 | 1995 SN_{15} | — | September 18, 1995 | Kitt Peak | Spacewatch | · | 4.0 km | MPC · JPL |
| 171482 | 1995 SN_{34} | — | September 22, 1995 | Kitt Peak | Spacewatch | · | 4.1 km | MPC · JPL |
| 171483 | 1995 SO_{45} | — | September 26, 1995 | Kitt Peak | Spacewatch | MAS | 780 m | MPC · JPL |
| 171484 | 1995 VZ_{3} | — | November 14, 1995 | Kitt Peak | Spacewatch | · | 4.6 km | MPC · JPL |
| 171485 | 1995 YZ_{2} | — | December 26, 1995 | Oizumi | T. Kobayashi | · | 4.5 km | MPC · JPL |
| 171486 | 1996 MO | — | June 23, 1996 | Kitt Peak | Spacewatch | APO | 740 m | MPC · JPL |
| 171487 | 1996 RA_{12} | — | September 8, 1996 | Kitt Peak | Spacewatch | · | 3.4 km | MPC · JPL |
| 171488 | 1996 TO_{16} | — | October 4, 1996 | Kitt Peak | Spacewatch | · | 2.3 km | MPC · JPL |
| 171489 | 1996 TB_{27} | — | October 7, 1996 | Kitt Peak | Spacewatch | · | 1.5 km | MPC · JPL |
| 171490 | 1996 TX_{31} | — | October 9, 1996 | Kitt Peak | Spacewatch | V | 1.2 km | MPC · JPL |
| 171491 | 1996 TT_{44} | — | October 6, 1996 | Kitt Peak | Spacewatch | · | 1.4 km | MPC · JPL |
| 171492 | 1996 VK_{1} | — | November 7, 1996 | Prescott | P. G. Comba | · | 1.5 km | MPC · JPL |
| 171493 | 1996 VQ_{13} | — | November 5, 1996 | Kitt Peak | Spacewatch | · | 3.3 km | MPC · JPL |
| 171494 | 1996 XS_{3} | — | December 1, 1996 | Kitt Peak | Spacewatch | · | 4.5 km | MPC · JPL |
| 171495 | 1996 XD_{24} | — | December 5, 1996 | Kitt Peak | Spacewatch | · | 2.4 km | MPC · JPL |
| 171496 | 1996 XY_{29} | — | December 14, 1996 | Kitt Peak | Spacewatch | MAS | 920 m | MPC · JPL |
| 171497 | 1997 BY_{2} | — | January 30, 1997 | Oizumi | T. Kobayashi | NYS | 2.1 km | MPC · JPL |
| 171498 | 1997 CD_{2} | — | February 2, 1997 | Kitt Peak | Spacewatch | · | 6.7 km | MPC · JPL |
| 171499 | 1997 GB_{17} | — | April 3, 1997 | Socorro | LINEAR | · | 2.1 km | MPC · JPL |
| 171500 | 1997 GJ_{20} | — | April 5, 1997 | Socorro | LINEAR | MAS | 1.3 km | MPC · JPL |

== 171501–171600 ==
back to top

| Designation | | | Discovery | | | Properties | | Ref |
| Permanent | Provisional | Named after | Date | Site | Discoverer(s) | Category | Diam. | Ref |
|---|---|---|---|---|---|---|---|---|
| 171501 | 1997 MZ_{5} | — | June 26, 1997 | Kitt Peak | Spacewatch | · | 2.8 km | MPC · JPL |
| 171502 | 1997 ND_{2} | — | July 3, 1997 | Kitt Peak | Spacewatch | · | 5.1 km | MPC · JPL |
| 171503 | 1998 DZ_{11} | — | February 23, 1998 | Kitt Peak | Spacewatch | NYS | 2.5 km | MPC · JPL |
| 171504 | 1998 EP_{5} | — | March 1, 1998 | Kitt Peak | Spacewatch | V | 1.0 km | MPC · JPL |
| 171505 | 1998 HV_{35} | — | April 20, 1998 | Socorro | LINEAR | · | 1.1 km | MPC · JPL |
| 171506 | 1998 HC_{44} | — | April 20, 1998 | Socorro | LINEAR | · | 1.6 km | MPC · JPL |
| 171507 | 1998 HC_{111} | — | April 23, 1998 | Socorro | LINEAR | · | 2.1 km | MPC · JPL |
| 171508 | 1998 MY_{13} | — | June 19, 1998 | Caussols | ODAS | · | 3.1 km | MPC · JPL |
| 171509 | 1998 QV_{18} | — | August 17, 1998 | Socorro | LINEAR | (5) | 2.7 km | MPC · JPL |
| 171510 | 1998 QC_{23} | — | August 17, 1998 | Socorro | LINEAR | · | 3.2 km | MPC · JPL |
| 171511 | 1998 QY_{83} | — | August 24, 1998 | Socorro | LINEAR | · | 2.0 km | MPC · JPL |
| 171512 | 1998 RP_{20} | — | September 14, 1998 | Ondřejov | L. Kotková | EUN | 2.1 km | MPC · JPL |
| 171513 | 1998 RJ_{63} | — | September 14, 1998 | Socorro | LINEAR | 3:2 · SHU | 8.7 km | MPC · JPL |
| 171514 | 1998 SG_{23} | — | September 17, 1998 | Anderson Mesa | LONEOS | ADE | 3.7 km | MPC · JPL |
| 171515 | 1998 SW_{48} | — | September 27, 1998 | Kitt Peak | Spacewatch | · | 3.8 km | MPC · JPL |
| 171516 | 1998 SQ_{92} | — | September 26, 1998 | Socorro | LINEAR | · | 1.7 km | MPC · JPL |
| 171517 | 1998 SQ_{155} | — | September 26, 1998 | Socorro | LINEAR | · | 3.0 km | MPC · JPL |
| 171518 | 1998 TO | — | October 10, 1998 | Goodricke-Pigott | R. A. Tucker | · | 2.8 km | MPC · JPL |
| 171519 | 1998 US_{19} | — | October 28, 1998 | Socorro | LINEAR | · | 2.8 km | MPC · JPL |
| 171520 | 1999 AR_{19} | — | January 13, 1999 | Kitt Peak | Spacewatch | · | 2.9 km | MPC · JPL |
| 171521 | 1999 CH_{3} | — | February 7, 1999 | Nachi-Katsuura | Y. Shimizu, T. Urata | · | 3.8 km | MPC · JPL |
| 171522 | 1999 CY_{5} | — | February 10, 1999 | Socorro | LINEAR | · | 1.3 km | MPC · JPL |
| 171523 | 1999 CE_{83} | — | February 10, 1999 | Socorro | LINEAR | · | 2.9 km | MPC · JPL |
| 171524 | 1999 CP_{111} | — | February 12, 1999 | Socorro | LINEAR | · | 6.3 km | MPC · JPL |
| 171525 | 1999 CW_{111} | — | February 12, 1999 | Socorro | LINEAR | · | 4.0 km | MPC · JPL |
| 171526 | 1999 HO_{7} | — | April 19, 1999 | Kitt Peak | Spacewatch | EOS | 3.2 km | MPC · JPL |
| 171527 | 1999 HT_{9} | — | April 17, 1999 | Socorro | LINEAR | · | 1.3 km | MPC · JPL |
| 171528 | 1999 JH_{28} | — | May 10, 1999 | Socorro | LINEAR | LIX | 6.9 km | MPC · JPL |
| 171529 | 1999 JK_{70} | — | May 12, 1999 | Socorro | LINEAR | · | 4.5 km | MPC · JPL |
| 171530 | 1999 JN_{102} | — | May 13, 1999 | Socorro | LINEAR | · | 1.2 km | MPC · JPL |
| 171531 | 1999 JR_{114} | — | May 13, 1999 | Socorro | LINEAR | · | 1.0 km | MPC · JPL |
| 171532 | 1999 JB_{134} | — | May 15, 1999 | Catalina | CSS | · | 4.8 km | MPC · JPL |
| 171533 | 1999 KC_{10} | — | May 18, 1999 | Socorro | LINEAR | · | 1.5 km | MPC · JPL |
| 171534 | 1999 NC_{48} | — | July 13, 1999 | Socorro | LINEAR | · | 2.4 km | MPC · JPL |
| 171535 | 1999 RZ_{11} | — | September 7, 1999 | Socorro | LINEAR | · | 2.2 km | MPC · JPL |
| 171536 | 1999 RH_{61} | — | September 7, 1999 | Socorro | LINEAR | · | 2.3 km | MPC · JPL |
| 171537 | 1999 RZ_{65} | — | September 7, 1999 | Socorro | LINEAR | · | 1.7 km | MPC · JPL |
| 171538 | 1999 RY_{66} | — | September 7, 1999 | Socorro | LINEAR | · | 2.2 km | MPC · JPL |
| 171539 | 1999 RJ_{86} | — | September 7, 1999 | Socorro | LINEAR | (6769) | 2.8 km | MPC · JPL |
| 171540 | 1999 RX_{86} | — | September 7, 1999 | Socorro | LINEAR | · | 1.9 km | MPC · JPL |
| 171541 | 1999 RY_{108} | — | September 8, 1999 | Socorro | LINEAR | V | 1.1 km | MPC · JPL |
| 171542 | 1999 RH_{125} | — | September 9, 1999 | Socorro | LINEAR | · | 1.9 km | MPC · JPL |
| 171543 | 1999 RM_{134} | — | September 9, 1999 | Socorro | LINEAR | · | 1.9 km | MPC · JPL |
| 171544 | 1999 RJ_{144} | — | September 9, 1999 | Socorro | LINEAR | · | 2.7 km | MPC · JPL |
| 171545 | 1999 RR_{145} | — | September 9, 1999 | Socorro | LINEAR | · | 1.6 km | MPC · JPL |
| 171546 | 1999 RA_{154} | — | September 9, 1999 | Socorro | LINEAR | · | 3.4 km | MPC · JPL |
| 171547 | 1999 RH_{154} | — | September 9, 1999 | Socorro | LINEAR | · | 3.9 km | MPC · JPL |
| 171548 | 1999 RS_{161} | — | September 9, 1999 | Socorro | LINEAR | NYS | 2.0 km | MPC · JPL |
| 171549 | 1999 RE_{209} | — | September 8, 1999 | Socorro | LINEAR | · | 2.3 km | MPC · JPL |
| 171550 | 1999 SK_{15} | — | September 30, 1999 | Catalina | CSS | · | 2.1 km | MPC · JPL |
| 171551 | 1999 TK_{7} | — | October 7, 1999 | Monte Agliale | S. Donati | · | 2.3 km | MPC · JPL |
| 171552 | 1999 TD_{12} | — | October 10, 1999 | Gnosca | S. Sposetti | NYS · | 4.3 km | MPC · JPL |
| 171553 | 1999 TG_{39} | — | October 3, 1999 | Catalina | CSS | (5) | 1.8 km | MPC · JPL |
| 171554 | 1999 TR_{57} | — | October 6, 1999 | Kitt Peak | Spacewatch | · | 2.0 km | MPC · JPL |
| 171555 | 1999 TF_{74} | — | October 10, 1999 | Kitt Peak | Spacewatch | · | 1.5 km | MPC · JPL |
| 171556 | 1999 TW_{129} | — | October 6, 1999 | Socorro | LINEAR | · | 3.7 km | MPC · JPL |
| 171557 | 1999 TO_{140} | — | October 6, 1999 | Socorro | LINEAR | · | 2.0 km | MPC · JPL |
| 171558 | 1999 TE_{147} | — | October 7, 1999 | Socorro | LINEAR | · | 1.5 km | MPC · JPL |
| 171559 | 1999 TU_{147} | — | October 7, 1999 | Socorro | LINEAR | · | 2.2 km | MPC · JPL |
| 171560 | 1999 TX_{161} | — | October 9, 1999 | Socorro | LINEAR | · | 1.9 km | MPC · JPL |
| 171561 | 1999 TT_{169} | — | October 10, 1999 | Socorro | LINEAR | NYS | 1.8 km | MPC · JPL |
| 171562 | 1999 TZ_{177} | — | October 10, 1999 | Socorro | LINEAR | T_{j} (2.99) · 3:2 · SHU | 6.3 km | MPC · JPL |
| 171563 | 1999 TR_{178} | — | October 10, 1999 | Socorro | LINEAR | · | 2.0 km | MPC · JPL |
| 171564 | 1999 TX_{219} | — | October 1, 1999 | Catalina | CSS | V | 1.1 km | MPC · JPL |
| 171565 | 1999 TD_{227} | — | October 5, 1999 | Socorro | LINEAR | · | 4.2 km | MPC · JPL |
| 171566 | 1999 TG_{272} | — | October 3, 1999 | Socorro | LINEAR | · | 2.1 km | MPC · JPL |
| 171567 | 1999 TF_{284} | — | October 9, 1999 | Socorro | LINEAR | · | 2.3 km | MPC · JPL |
| 171568 | 1999 TJ_{286} | — | October 10, 1999 | Socorro | LINEAR | · | 1.8 km | MPC · JPL |
| 171569 | 1999 UD_{3} | — | October 16, 1999 | Bergisch Gladbach | W. Bickel | (5) | 1.2 km | MPC · JPL |
| 171570 | 1999 UK_{28} | — | October 31, 1999 | Kitt Peak | Spacewatch | · | 1.3 km | MPC · JPL |
| 171571 | 1999 US_{38} | — | October 29, 1999 | Anderson Mesa | LONEOS | · | 2.8 km | MPC · JPL |
| 171572 | 1999 UJ_{42} | — | October 21, 1999 | Socorro | LINEAR | H | 1.0 km | MPC · JPL |
| 171573 | 1999 UH_{43} | — | October 28, 1999 | Catalina | CSS | · | 2.4 km | MPC · JPL |
| 171574 | 1999 VS_{4} | — | November 5, 1999 | Višnjan Observatory | K. Korlević | · | 1.6 km | MPC · JPL |
| 171575 | 1999 VM_{5} | — | November 6, 1999 | Fountain Hills | C. W. Juels | · | 3.6 km | MPC · JPL |
| 171576 | 1999 VP_{11} | — | November 7, 1999 | Socorro | LINEAR | APO · PHA | 650 m | MPC · JPL |
| 171577 | 1999 VW_{14} | — | November 2, 1999 | Kitt Peak | Spacewatch | V | 1.1 km | MPC · JPL |
| 171578 | 1999 VW_{21} | — | November 12, 1999 | Višnjan Observatory | K. Korlević | · | 1.6 km | MPC · JPL |
| 171579 | 1999 VD_{23} | — | November 12, 1999 | Gnosca | S. Sposetti | · | 1.7 km | MPC · JPL |
| 171580 | 1999 VW_{42} | — | November 4, 1999 | Kitt Peak | Spacewatch | NYS | 1.8 km | MPC · JPL |
| 171581 | 1999 VE_{57} | — | November 4, 1999 | Socorro | LINEAR | · | 3.6 km | MPC · JPL |
| 171582 | 1999 VX_{80} | — | November 4, 1999 | Socorro | LINEAR | · | 2.5 km | MPC · JPL |
| 171583 | 1999 VQ_{88} | — | November 4, 1999 | Socorro | LINEAR | NYS | 1.4 km | MPC · JPL |
| 171584 | 1999 VF_{96} | — | November 9, 1999 | Socorro | LINEAR | (5) | 1.6 km | MPC · JPL |
| 171585 | 1999 VG_{104} | — | November 9, 1999 | Socorro | LINEAR | HIL · 3:2 | 9.2 km | MPC · JPL |
| 171586 | 1999 VR_{164} | — | November 14, 1999 | Socorro | LINEAR | · | 2.2 km | MPC · JPL |
| 171587 | 1999 VU_{168} | — | November 14, 1999 | Socorro | LINEAR | · | 2.2 km | MPC · JPL |
| 171588 Náprstek | 1999 WG_{1} | Náprstek | November 26, 1999 | Kleť | J. Tichá, M. Tichý | NYS | 2.2 km | MPC · JPL |
| 171589 | 1999 WP_{5} | — | November 28, 1999 | Kitt Peak | Spacewatch | H | 800 m | MPC · JPL |
| 171590 | 1999 WH_{7} | — | November 28, 1999 | Višnjan Observatory | K. Korlević | · | 2.1 km | MPC · JPL |
| 171591 | 1999 WT_{10} | — | November 28, 1999 | Kitt Peak | Spacewatch | (5) | 1.4 km | MPC · JPL |
| 171592 | 1999 WN_{14} | — | November 28, 1999 | Kitt Peak | Spacewatch | · | 2.2 km | MPC · JPL |
| 171593 | 1999 XK_{40} | — | December 7, 1999 | Socorro | LINEAR | · | 1.7 km | MPC · JPL |
| 171594 | 1999 XZ_{40} | — | December 7, 1999 | Socorro | LINEAR | EUN | 1.9 km | MPC · JPL |
| 171595 | 1999 XM_{44} | — | December 7, 1999 | Socorro | LINEAR | · | 2.1 km | MPC · JPL |
| 171596 | 1999 XN_{47} | — | December 7, 1999 | Socorro | LINEAR | MAS | 1.1 km | MPC · JPL |
| 171597 | 1999 XV_{53} | — | December 7, 1999 | Socorro | LINEAR | (5) | 2.0 km | MPC · JPL |
| 171598 | 1999 XN_{57} | — | December 7, 1999 | Socorro | LINEAR | · | 2.2 km | MPC · JPL |
| 171599 | 1999 XJ_{63} | — | December 7, 1999 | Socorro | LINEAR | RAF | 1.3 km | MPC · JPL |
| 171600 | 1999 XN_{122} | — | December 7, 1999 | Catalina | CSS | HIL · 3:2 · (3561) | 10 km | MPC · JPL |

== 171601–171700 ==
back to top

| Designation | | | Discovery | | | Properties | | Ref |
| Permanent | Provisional | Named after | Date | Site | Discoverer(s) | Category | Diam. | Ref |
|---|---|---|---|---|---|---|---|---|
| 171601 | 1999 XQ_{164} | — | December 8, 1999 | Socorro | LINEAR | H | 1.2 km | MPC · JPL |
| 171602 | 1999 XP_{172} | — | December 10, 1999 | Socorro | LINEAR | EUN | 2.9 km | MPC · JPL |
| 171603 | 1999 XA_{180} | — | December 10, 1999 | Socorro | LINEAR | · | 2.5 km | MPC · JPL |
| 171604 | 1999 XC_{218} | — | December 13, 1999 | Kitt Peak | Spacewatch | · | 2.1 km | MPC · JPL |
| 171605 | 1999 XB_{246} | — | December 5, 1999 | Socorro | LINEAR | EUN | 1.8 km | MPC · JPL |
| 171606 | 1999 YT_{16} | — | December 31, 1999 | Kitt Peak | Spacewatch | · | 2.0 km | MPC · JPL |
| 171607 | 2000 AU_{13} | — | January 3, 2000 | Socorro | LINEAR | · | 4.1 km | MPC · JPL |
| 171608 | 2000 AO_{62} | — | January 4, 2000 | Socorro | LINEAR | · | 2.6 km | MPC · JPL |
| 171609 | 2000 AS_{86} | — | January 5, 2000 | Socorro | LINEAR | (5) | 1.7 km | MPC · JPL |
| 171610 | 2000 AL_{93} | — | January 4, 2000 | Socorro | LINEAR | H | 1.1 km | MPC · JPL |
| 171611 | 2000 AG_{113} | — | January 5, 2000 | Socorro | LINEAR | · | 2.2 km | MPC · JPL |
| 171612 | 2000 AS_{241} | — | January 7, 2000 | Anderson Mesa | LONEOS | EUN | 1.9 km | MPC · JPL |
| 171613 | 2000 AZ_{257} | — | January 11, 2000 | Socorro | LINEAR | · | 4.2 km | MPC · JPL |
| 171614 | 2000 BU_{6} | — | January 27, 2000 | Socorro | LINEAR | (5) | 2.5 km | MPC · JPL |
| 171615 | 2000 BE_{9} | — | January 26, 2000 | Kitt Peak | Spacewatch | · | 2.1 km | MPC · JPL |
| 171616 | 2000 BL_{22} | — | January 30, 2000 | Kitt Peak | Spacewatch | · | 2.0 km | MPC · JPL |
| 171617 | 2000 BY_{31} | — | January 30, 2000 | Catalina | CSS | · | 1.7 km | MPC · JPL |
| 171618 | 2000 BB_{37} | — | January 30, 2000 | Kitt Peak | Spacewatch | · | 2.1 km | MPC · JPL |
| 171619 | 2000 CX_{2} | — | February 2, 2000 | Modra | A. Galád, P. Kolény | · | 2.5 km | MPC · JPL |
| 171620 | 2000 CG_{40} | — | February 4, 2000 | Socorro | LINEAR | H | 1.3 km | MPC · JPL |
| 171621 | 2000 CR_{58} | — | February 2, 2000 | Socorro | LINEAR | H | 1.1 km | MPC · JPL |
| 171622 | 2000 CJ_{96} | — | February 11, 2000 | Kitt Peak | Spacewatch | (5) | 1.8 km | MPC · JPL |
| 171623 | 2000 CL_{98} | — | February 8, 2000 | Kitt Peak | Spacewatch | · | 1.8 km | MPC · JPL |
| 171624 Nicolemartin | 2000 CT_{106} | Nicolemartin | February 5, 2000 | Kitt Peak | M. W. Buie | · | 2.6 km | MPC · JPL |
| 171625 | 2000 CW_{112} | — | February 7, 2000 | Kitt Peak | Spacewatch | · | 3.0 km | MPC · JPL |
| 171626 | 2000 CU_{113} | — | February 11, 2000 | Socorro | LINEAR | · | 1.9 km | MPC · JPL |
| 171627 | 2000 CS_{135} | — | February 4, 2000 | Kitt Peak | Spacewatch | · | 2.4 km | MPC · JPL |
| 171628 | 2000 DE_{25} | — | February 29, 2000 | Socorro | LINEAR | MRX | 2.2 km | MPC · JPL |
| 171629 | 2000 DH_{73} | — | February 29, 2000 | Socorro | LINEAR | · | 2.7 km | MPC · JPL |
| 171630 | 2000 DB_{81} | — | February 28, 2000 | Socorro | LINEAR | (5) | 2.0 km | MPC · JPL |
| 171631 | 2000 DT_{97} | — | February 29, 2000 | Socorro | LINEAR | · | 1.9 km | MPC · JPL |
| 171632 | 2000 DJ_{100} | — | February 29, 2000 | Socorro | LINEAR | · | 2.3 km | MPC · JPL |
| 171633 | 2000 DQ_{108} | — | February 29, 2000 | Socorro | LINEAR | · | 2.6 km | MPC · JPL |
| 171634 | 2000 EQ_{10} | — | March 3, 2000 | Socorro | LINEAR | · | 4.0 km | MPC · JPL |
| 171635 | 2000 EA_{46} | — | March 9, 2000 | Socorro | LINEAR | · | 1.6 km | MPC · JPL |
| 171636 | 2000 EP_{64} | — | March 10, 2000 | Socorro | LINEAR | · | 1.6 km | MPC · JPL |
| 171637 | 2000 ES_{80} | — | March 5, 2000 | Socorro | LINEAR | (5) | 1.9 km | MPC · JPL |
| 171638 | 2000 ED_{88} | — | March 9, 2000 | Socorro | LINEAR | · | 3.5 km | MPC · JPL |
| 171639 | 2000 EC_{115} | — | March 10, 2000 | Kitt Peak | Spacewatch | KOR | 2.2 km | MPC · JPL |
| 171640 | 2000 EZ_{125} | — | March 11, 2000 | Anderson Mesa | LONEOS | · | 2.1 km | MPC · JPL |
| 171641 | 2000 EE_{134} | — | March 11, 2000 | Anderson Mesa | LONEOS | JUN | 1.6 km | MPC · JPL |
| 171642 | 2000 EK_{157} | — | March 11, 2000 | Catalina | CSS | JUN | 5.2 km | MPC · JPL |
| 171643 | 2000 EX_{171} | — | March 5, 2000 | Socorro | LINEAR | · | 2.6 km | MPC · JPL |
| 171644 | 2000 FJ_{7} | — | March 29, 2000 | Kitt Peak | Spacewatch | AST | 1.8 km | MPC · JPL |
| 171645 | 2000 FL_{7} | — | March 29, 2000 | Kitt Peak | Spacewatch | · | 5.2 km | MPC · JPL |
| 171646 | 2000 FL_{14} | — | March 30, 2000 | Kitt Peak | Spacewatch | AGN | 1.7 km | MPC · JPL |
| 171647 | 2000 FU_{14} | — | March 29, 2000 | Socorro | LINEAR | · | 2.6 km | MPC · JPL |
| 171648 | 2000 FS_{27} | — | March 27, 2000 | Anderson Mesa | LONEOS | · | 4.5 km | MPC · JPL |
| 171649 | 2000 FQ_{63} | — | March 29, 2000 | Socorro | LINEAR | · | 3.0 km | MPC · JPL |
| 171650 | 2000 FW_{71} | — | March 27, 2000 | Anderson Mesa | LONEOS | · | 3.5 km | MPC · JPL |
| 171651 | 2000 GK_{24} | — | April 5, 2000 | Socorro | LINEAR | · | 2.8 km | MPC · JPL |
| 171652 | 2000 GQ_{37} | — | April 5, 2000 | Socorro | LINEAR | · | 2.4 km | MPC · JPL |
| 171653 | 2000 GV_{60} | — | April 5, 2000 | Socorro | LINEAR | · | 2.5 km | MPC · JPL |
| 171654 | 2000 GO_{132} | — | April 11, 2000 | Kitt Peak | Spacewatch | AGN | 1.7 km | MPC · JPL |
| 171655 | 2000 GW_{140} | — | April 4, 2000 | Anderson Mesa | LONEOS | JUN | 1.5 km | MPC · JPL |
| 171656 | 2000 GW_{167} | — | April 4, 2000 | Anderson Mesa | LONEOS | · | 3.4 km | MPC · JPL |
| 171657 | 2000 GH_{176} | — | April 2, 2000 | Anderson Mesa | LONEOS | (5) | 2.2 km | MPC · JPL |
| 171658 | 2000 HK_{84} | — | April 30, 2000 | Socorro | LINEAR | · | 7.2 km | MPC · JPL |
| 171659 | 2000 HR_{94} | — | April 29, 2000 | Socorro | LINEAR | · | 6.7 km | MPC · JPL |
| 171660 | 2000 JH_{13} | — | May 6, 2000 | Socorro | LINEAR | · | 3.3 km | MPC · JPL |
| 171661 | 2000 JZ_{17} | — | May 9, 2000 | Socorro | LINEAR | T_{j} (2.99) | 4.2 km | MPC · JPL |
| 171662 | 2000 JF_{30} | — | May 7, 2000 | Socorro | LINEAR | · | 3.2 km | MPC · JPL |
| 171663 | 2000 JS_{41} | — | May 7, 2000 | Socorro | LINEAR | · | 4.8 km | MPC · JPL |
| 171664 | 2000 KW | — | May 24, 2000 | Kitt Peak | Spacewatch | · | 2.7 km | MPC · JPL |
| 171665 | 2000 KK_{23} | — | May 28, 2000 | Socorro | LINEAR | · | 1 km | MPC · JPL |
| 171666 | 2000 KD_{51} | — | May 30, 2000 | Kitt Peak | Spacewatch | · | 1.7 km | MPC · JPL |
| 171667 | 2000 NU_{14} | — | July 5, 2000 | Anderson Mesa | LONEOS | · | 1.1 km | MPC · JPL |
| 171668 | 2000 NZ_{17} | — | July 5, 2000 | Anderson Mesa | LONEOS | · | 1.3 km | MPC · JPL |
| 171669 | 2000 OM_{54} | — | July 29, 2000 | Anderson Mesa | LONEOS | EOS | 3.4 km | MPC · JPL |
| 171670 | 2000 OX_{59} | — | July 29, 2000 | Anderson Mesa | LONEOS | · | 1.4 km | MPC · JPL |
| 171671 | 2000 PF_{32} | — | August 1, 2000 | Socorro | LINEAR | · | 1 km | MPC · JPL |
| 171672 | 2000 QL_{13} | — | August 24, 2000 | Socorro | LINEAR | · | 1.1 km | MPC · JPL |
| 171673 | 2000 QB_{33} | — | August 26, 2000 | Socorro | LINEAR | · | 1.2 km | MPC · JPL |
| 171674 | 2000 QA_{37} | — | August 24, 2000 | Socorro | LINEAR | · | 1.4 km | MPC · JPL |
| 171675 | 2000 QN_{58} | — | August 26, 2000 | Socorro | LINEAR | · | 1.2 km | MPC · JPL |
| 171676 | 2000 QX_{58} | — | August 26, 2000 | Socorro | LINEAR | · | 1.8 km | MPC · JPL |
| 171677 | 2000 QG_{136} | — | August 29, 2000 | Socorro | LINEAR | THM | 5.4 km | MPC · JPL |
| 171678 | 2000 QD_{170} | — | August 31, 2000 | Socorro | LINEAR | · | 4.9 km | MPC · JPL |
| 171679 | 2000 QN_{226} | — | August 31, 2000 | Kitt Peak | Spacewatch | · | 5.1 km | MPC · JPL |
| 171680 | 2000 RS_{21} | — | September 1, 2000 | Socorro | LINEAR | · | 1.1 km | MPC · JPL |
| 171681 | 2000 RK_{23} | — | September 1, 2000 | Socorro | LINEAR | · | 1.4 km | MPC · JPL |
| 171682 | 2000 RL_{31} | — | September 1, 2000 | Socorro | LINEAR | · | 1.2 km | MPC · JPL |
| 171683 | 2000 RG_{32} | — | September 1, 2000 | Socorro | LINEAR | · | 1.1 km | MPC · JPL |
| 171684 | 2000 RN_{53} | — | September 7, 2000 | Elmira | Cecce, A. J. | · | 1.3 km | MPC · JPL |
| 171685 | 2000 RV_{90} | — | September 3, 2000 | Socorro | LINEAR | · | 1.3 km | MPC · JPL |
| 171686 | 2000 SZ_{12} | — | September 21, 2000 | Socorro | LINEAR | · | 1.1 km | MPC · JPL |
| 171687 | 2000 SO_{18} | — | September 23, 2000 | Socorro | LINEAR | · | 5.5 km | MPC · JPL |
| 171688 | 2000 SP_{18} | — | September 23, 2000 | Socorro | LINEAR | · | 6.3 km | MPC · JPL |
| 171689 | 2000 SQ_{28} | — | September 23, 2000 | Socorro | LINEAR | · | 1.1 km | MPC · JPL |
| 171690 | 2000 SF_{41} | — | September 24, 2000 | Socorro | LINEAR | · | 1.2 km | MPC · JPL |
| 171691 | 2000 SG_{49} | — | September 23, 2000 | Socorro | LINEAR | · | 1.3 km | MPC · JPL |
| 171692 | 2000 SN_{55} | — | September 24, 2000 | Socorro | LINEAR | · | 1.3 km | MPC · JPL |
| 171693 | 2000 SB_{98} | — | September 23, 2000 | Socorro | LINEAR | · | 960 m | MPC · JPL |
| 171694 | 2000 SQ_{102} | — | September 24, 2000 | Socorro | LINEAR | · | 1.2 km | MPC · JPL |
| 171695 | 2000 SE_{113} | — | September 24, 2000 | Socorro | LINEAR | · | 1.5 km | MPC · JPL |
| 171696 | 2000 SK_{137} | — | September 23, 2000 | Socorro | LINEAR | · | 1.3 km | MPC · JPL |
| 171697 | 2000 SG_{138} | — | September 23, 2000 | Socorro | LINEAR | · | 1.1 km | MPC · JPL |
| 171698 | 2000 SA_{164} | — | September 24, 2000 | Socorro | LINEAR | PHO | 4.5 km | MPC · JPL |
| 171699 | 2000 SD_{169} | — | September 23, 2000 | Socorro | LINEAR | · | 1.3 km | MPC · JPL |
| 171700 | 2000 SA_{211} | — | September 25, 2000 | Socorro | LINEAR | V | 1.2 km | MPC · JPL |

== 171701–171800 ==
back to top

| Designation | | | Discovery | | | Properties | | Ref |
| Permanent | Provisional | Named after | Date | Site | Discoverer(s) | Category | Diam. | Ref |
|---|---|---|---|---|---|---|---|---|
| 171701 | 2000 SU_{262} | — | September 25, 2000 | Socorro | LINEAR | · | 1.3 km | MPC · JPL |
| 171702 | 2000 SH_{280} | — | September 30, 2000 | Socorro | LINEAR | · | 1.2 km | MPC · JPL |
| 171703 | 2000 SC_{293} | — | September 27, 2000 | Socorro | LINEAR | · | 1.2 km | MPC · JPL |
| 171704 | 2000 SU_{294} | — | September 27, 2000 | Socorro | LINEAR | PHO | 2.0 km | MPC · JPL |
| 171705 | 2000 SC_{302} | — | September 28, 2000 | Socorro | LINEAR | · | 1.3 km | MPC · JPL |
| 171706 | 2000 SE_{308} | — | September 30, 2000 | Socorro | LINEAR | · | 1.9 km | MPC · JPL |
| 171707 | 2000 SV_{327} | — | September 30, 2000 | Socorro | LINEAR | · | 1.3 km | MPC · JPL |
| 171708 | 2000 TL_{24} | — | October 2, 2000 | Socorro | LINEAR | · | 1.2 km | MPC · JPL |
| 171709 | 2000 TC_{45} | — | October 1, 2000 | Socorro | LINEAR | · | 1.1 km | MPC · JPL |
| 171710 | 2000 TD_{51} | — | October 1, 2000 | Socorro | LINEAR | · | 1.5 km | MPC · JPL |
| 171711 | 2000 TR_{63} | — | October 3, 2000 | Socorro | LINEAR | · | 1.4 km | MPC · JPL |
| 171712 | 2000 UO_{8} | — | October 24, 2000 | Socorro | LINEAR | · | 1.7 km | MPC · JPL |
| 171713 | 2000 UC_{20} | — | October 24, 2000 | Socorro | LINEAR | · | 1.1 km | MPC · JPL |
| 171714 | 2000 UW_{42} | — | October 24, 2000 | Socorro | LINEAR | · | 1.2 km | MPC · JPL |
| 171715 | 2000 UD_{43} | — | October 24, 2000 | Socorro | LINEAR | · | 1.3 km | MPC · JPL |
| 171716 | 2000 UD_{57} | — | October 25, 2000 | Socorro | LINEAR | · | 1.3 km | MPC · JPL |
| 171717 | 2000 UP_{59} | — | October 25, 2000 | Socorro | LINEAR | · | 1.4 km | MPC · JPL |
| 171718 | 2000 UQ_{69} | — | October 25, 2000 | Socorro | LINEAR | · | 1.4 km | MPC · JPL |
| 171719 | 2000 UN_{85} | — | October 31, 2000 | Socorro | LINEAR | · | 990 m | MPC · JPL |
| 171720 | 2000 US_{92} | — | October 25, 2000 | Socorro | LINEAR | · | 1.2 km | MPC · JPL |
| 171721 | 2000 UW_{93} | — | October 25, 2000 | Socorro | LINEAR | · | 1.4 km | MPC · JPL |
| 171722 | 2000 UH_{109} | — | October 31, 2000 | Socorro | LINEAR | · | 1.4 km | MPC · JPL |
| 171723 | 2000 VG_{13} | — | November 1, 2000 | Socorro | LINEAR | · | 1.4 km | MPC · JPL |
| 171724 | 2000 WG | — | November 16, 2000 | Kitt Peak | Spacewatch | · | 1.0 km | MPC · JPL |
| 171725 | 2000 WW_{15} | — | November 21, 2000 | Socorro | LINEAR | (2076) | 1.3 km | MPC · JPL |
| 171726 | 2000 WO_{21} | — | November 21, 2000 | Needville | Needville | · | 1.0 km | MPC · JPL |
| 171727 | 2000 WT_{24} | — | November 20, 2000 | Socorro | LINEAR | · | 1.5 km | MPC · JPL |
| 171728 | 2000 WX_{25} | — | November 21, 2000 | Socorro | LINEAR | · | 1.2 km | MPC · JPL |
| 171729 | 2000 WE_{31} | — | November 20, 2000 | Socorro | LINEAR | · | 1.6 km | MPC · JPL |
| 171730 | 2000 WX_{50} | — | November 20, 2000 | Socorro | LINEAR | · | 910 m | MPC · JPL |
| 171731 | 2000 WD_{56} | — | November 20, 2000 | Socorro | LINEAR | · | 2.6 km | MPC · JPL |
| 171732 | 2000 WR_{65} | — | November 28, 2000 | Kitt Peak | Spacewatch | · | 1.2 km | MPC · JPL |
| 171733 | 2000 WD_{71} | — | November 19, 2000 | Socorro | LINEAR | V | 1.2 km | MPC · JPL |
| 171734 | 2000 WY_{76} | — | November 20, 2000 | Socorro | LINEAR | · | 1.6 km | MPC · JPL |
| 171735 | 2000 WT_{94} | — | November 21, 2000 | Socorro | LINEAR | · | 950 m | MPC · JPL |
| 171736 | 2000 WQ_{97} | — | November 21, 2000 | Socorro | LINEAR | · | 1.7 km | MPC · JPL |
| 171737 | 2000 WA_{98} | — | November 21, 2000 | Socorro | LINEAR | · | 1.6 km | MPC · JPL |
| 171738 | 2000 WB_{110} | — | November 20, 2000 | Socorro | LINEAR | · | 1.3 km | MPC · JPL |
| 171739 | 2000 WG_{115} | — | November 20, 2000 | Socorro | LINEAR | · | 1.4 km | MPC · JPL |
| 171740 | 2000 WH_{115} | — | November 20, 2000 | Socorro | LINEAR | · | 1.6 km | MPC · JPL |
| 171741 | 2000 WX_{119} | — | November 20, 2000 | Socorro | LINEAR | · | 1.5 km | MPC · JPL |
| 171742 | 2000 WF_{177} | — | November 27, 2000 | Socorro | LINEAR | · | 1.2 km | MPC · JPL |
| 171743 | 2000 WD_{184} | — | November 30, 2000 | Anderson Mesa | LONEOS | · | 980 m | MPC · JPL |
| 171744 | 2000 WU_{195} | — | November 20, 2000 | Socorro | LINEAR | · | 2.5 km | MPC · JPL |
| 171745 | 2000 XU | — | December 1, 2000 | Kitt Peak | Spacewatch | (260) · CYB | 6.9 km | MPC · JPL |
| 171746 | 2000 XT_{18} | — | December 4, 2000 | Socorro | LINEAR | · | 1.7 km | MPC · JPL |
| 171747 | 2000 XU_{30} | — | December 4, 2000 | Socorro | LINEAR | (2076) | 1.4 km | MPC · JPL |
| 171748 | 2000 YM_{2} | — | December 19, 2000 | Socorro | LINEAR | · | 3.3 km | MPC · JPL |
| 171749 | 2000 YG_{5} | — | December 20, 2000 | Socorro | LINEAR | · | 1.8 km | MPC · JPL |
| 171750 | 2000 YS_{10} | — | December 22, 2000 | Socorro | LINEAR | V | 1.0 km | MPC · JPL |
| 171751 | 2000 YB_{17} | — | December 22, 2000 | Socorro | LINEAR | PHO | 1.7 km | MPC · JPL |
| 171752 | 2000 YZ_{21} | — | December 29, 2000 | Desert Beaver | W. K. Y. Yeung | ERI | 2.8 km | MPC · JPL |
| 171753 | 2000 YN_{22} | — | December 28, 2000 | Kitt Peak | Spacewatch | NYS | 1.4 km | MPC · JPL |
| 171754 | 2000 YB_{24} | — | December 28, 2000 | Kitt Peak | Spacewatch | V | 1.2 km | MPC · JPL |
| 171755 | 2000 YR_{43} | — | December 30, 2000 | Socorro | LINEAR | · | 1.1 km | MPC · JPL |
| 171756 | 2000 YH_{59} | — | December 30, 2000 | Socorro | LINEAR | · | 2.1 km | MPC · JPL |
| 171757 | 2000 YK_{59} | — | December 30, 2000 | Socorro | LINEAR | · | 1.6 km | MPC · JPL |
| 171758 | 2000 YZ_{83} | — | December 30, 2000 | Socorro | LINEAR | · | 1.6 km | MPC · JPL |
| 171759 | 2000 YR_{92} | — | December 30, 2000 | Socorro | LINEAR | NYS | 1.5 km | MPC · JPL |
| 171760 | 2000 YU_{97} | — | December 30, 2000 | Socorro | LINEAR | NYS | 1.6 km | MPC · JPL |
| 171761 | 2000 YR_{98} | — | December 30, 2000 | Socorro | LINEAR | · | 2.1 km | MPC · JPL |
| 171762 | 2000 YT_{108} | — | December 30, 2000 | Socorro | LINEAR | · | 5.2 km | MPC · JPL |
| 171763 | 2000 YM_{110} | — | December 30, 2000 | Socorro | LINEAR | NYS | 1.3 km | MPC · JPL |
| 171764 | 2000 YP_{110} | — | December 30, 2000 | Socorro | LINEAR | · | 1.6 km | MPC · JPL |
| 171765 | 2000 YO_{131} | — | December 30, 2000 | Desert Beaver | W. K. Y. Yeung | · | 1.6 km | MPC · JPL |
| 171766 | 2000 YY_{143} | — | December 29, 2000 | Anderson Mesa | LONEOS | · | 2.0 km | MPC · JPL |
| 171767 | 2001 AW_{8} | — | January 2, 2001 | Socorro | LINEAR | · | 1.9 km | MPC · JPL |
| 171768 | 2001 AW_{22} | — | January 3, 2001 | Socorro | LINEAR | · | 1.3 km | MPC · JPL |
| 171769 | 2001 AD_{40} | — | January 3, 2001 | Anderson Mesa | LONEOS | · | 1.7 km | MPC · JPL |
| 171770 | 2001 AO_{51} | — | January 15, 2001 | Kitt Peak | Spacewatch | MAS | 1.1 km | MPC · JPL |
| 171771 | 2001 AM_{53} | — | January 4, 2001 | Socorro | LINEAR | · | 1.4 km | MPC · JPL |
| 171772 | 2001 BN_{9} | — | January 19, 2001 | Socorro | LINEAR | · | 1.9 km | MPC · JPL |
| 171773 | 2001 BJ_{10} | — | January 17, 2001 | Oizumi | T. Kobayashi | · | 1.6 km | MPC · JPL |
| 171774 | 2001 BW_{18} | — | January 19, 2001 | Socorro | LINEAR | · | 2.0 km | MPC · JPL |
| 171775 | 2001 BC_{20} | — | January 19, 2001 | Socorro | LINEAR | · | 1.1 km | MPC · JPL |
| 171776 | 2001 BU_{21} | — | January 20, 2001 | Socorro | LINEAR | PHO | 2.5 km | MPC · JPL |
| 171777 | 2001 BP_{22} | — | January 20, 2001 | Socorro | LINEAR | · | 1.9 km | MPC · JPL |
| 171778 | 2001 BG_{24} | — | January 20, 2001 | Socorro | LINEAR | · | 1.7 km | MPC · JPL |
| 171779 | 2001 BF_{40} | — | January 18, 2001 | Socorro | LINEAR | · | 1.1 km | MPC · JPL |
| 171780 | 2001 BN_{41} | — | January 24, 2001 | Kitt Peak | Spacewatch | · | 1.6 km | MPC · JPL |
| 171781 | 2001 BG_{52} | — | January 17, 2001 | Kitt Peak | Spacewatch | · | 1.6 km | MPC · JPL |
| 171782 | 2001 BK_{52} | — | January 17, 2001 | Kitt Peak | Spacewatch | · | 1.2 km | MPC · JPL |
| 171783 | 2001 BX_{62} | — | January 29, 2001 | Socorro | LINEAR | · | 1.5 km | MPC · JPL |
| 171784 | 2001 BV_{67} | — | January 31, 2001 | Socorro | LINEAR | · | 1.7 km | MPC · JPL |
| 171785 | 2001 BK_{70} | — | January 25, 2001 | Needville | Dillon, W. G. | NYS | 1.6 km | MPC · JPL |
| 171786 | 2001 BF_{83} | — | January 21, 2001 | Socorro | LINEAR | · | 1.7 km | MPC · JPL |
| 171787 | 2001 CG_{2} | — | February 1, 2001 | Socorro | LINEAR | · | 1.9 km | MPC · JPL |
| 171788 | 2001 CR_{3} | — | February 1, 2001 | Socorro | LINEAR | · | 2.1 km | MPC · JPL |
| 171789 | 2001 CJ_{8} | — | February 1, 2001 | Socorro | LINEAR | · | 2.1 km | MPC · JPL |
| 171790 | 2001 CP_{14} | — | February 1, 2001 | Socorro | LINEAR | · | 1.6 km | MPC · JPL |
| 171791 | 2001 CZ_{16} | — | February 1, 2001 | Socorro | LINEAR | · | 2.2 km | MPC · JPL |
| 171792 | 2001 CM_{33} | — | February 13, 2001 | Socorro | LINEAR | PHO | 2.6 km | MPC · JPL |
| 171793 | 2001 CW_{42} | — | February 13, 2001 | Socorro | LINEAR | (2076) | 1.0 km | MPC · JPL |
| 171794 | 2001 DM_{7} | — | February 16, 2001 | Oizumi | T. Kobayashi | · | 2.2 km | MPC · JPL |
| 171795 | 2001 DX_{15} | — | February 16, 2001 | Socorro | LINEAR | · | 1.8 km | MPC · JPL |
| 171796 | 2001 DX_{16} | — | February 16, 2001 | Socorro | LINEAR | · | 1.7 km | MPC · JPL |
| 171797 | 2001 DL_{18} | — | February 16, 2001 | Socorro | LINEAR | · | 2.2 km | MPC · JPL |
| 171798 | 2001 DW_{24} | — | February 17, 2001 | Socorro | LINEAR | · | 2.1 km | MPC · JPL |
| 171799 | 2001 DO_{32} | — | February 17, 2001 | Socorro | LINEAR | · | 3.0 km | MPC · JPL |
| 171800 | 2001 DJ_{38} | — | February 19, 2001 | Socorro | LINEAR | V | 1.2 km | MPC · JPL |

== 171801–171900 ==
back to top

| Designation | | | Discovery | | | Properties | | Ref |
| Permanent | Provisional | Named after | Date | Site | Discoverer(s) | Category | Diam. | Ref |
|---|---|---|---|---|---|---|---|---|
| 171801 | 2001 DE_{39} | — | February 19, 2001 | Socorro | LINEAR | · | 1.1 km | MPC · JPL |
| 171802 | 2001 DV_{39} | — | February 19, 2001 | Socorro | LINEAR | · | 2.0 km | MPC · JPL |
| 171803 | 2001 DY_{42} | — | February 19, 2001 | Socorro | LINEAR | MAS | 1.3 km | MPC · JPL |
| 171804 | 2001 DF_{49} | — | February 16, 2001 | Socorro | LINEAR | · | 2.1 km | MPC · JPL |
| 171805 | 2001 DL_{52} | — | February 17, 2001 | Socorro | LINEAR | · | 2.2 km | MPC · JPL |
| 171806 | 2001 DA_{63} | — | February 19, 2001 | Socorro | LINEAR | · | 1.2 km | MPC · JPL |
| 171807 | 2001 DV_{64} | — | February 19, 2001 | Socorro | LINEAR | · | 1.8 km | MPC · JPL |
| 171808 | 2001 DQ_{81} | — | February 21, 2001 | Kitt Peak | Spacewatch | · | 1.5 km | MPC · JPL |
| 171809 | 2001 DO_{86} | — | February 25, 2001 | Ondřejov | P. Kušnirák | · | 1.1 km | MPC · JPL |
| 171810 | 2001 DY_{86} | — | February 18, 2001 | Haleakala | NEAT | H | 840 m | MPC · JPL |
| 171811 | 2001 DE_{87} | — | February 24, 2001 | Haleakala | NEAT | · | 2.3 km | MPC · JPL |
| 171812 | 2001 DW_{95} | — | February 17, 2001 | Socorro | LINEAR | NYS | 1.7 km | MPC · JPL |
| 171813 | 2001 DJ_{103} | — | February 16, 2001 | Socorro | LINEAR | PHO | 1.7 km | MPC · JPL |
| 171814 | 2001 DS_{103} | — | February 16, 2001 | Črni Vrh | Matičič, S. | NYS | 1.5 km | MPC · JPL |
| 171815 | 2001 EF_{9} | — | March 2, 2001 | Anderson Mesa | LONEOS | · | 1.8 km | MPC · JPL |
| 171816 | 2001 EN_{16} | — | March 15, 2001 | Haleakala | NEAT | · | 2.2 km | MPC · JPL |
| 171817 | 2001 EB_{22} | — | March 15, 2001 | Kitt Peak | Spacewatch | · | 2.9 km | MPC · JPL |
| 171818 | 2001 FH_{5} | — | March 18, 2001 | Socorro | LINEAR | MAS | 1.2 km | MPC · JPL |
| 171819 | 2001 FZ_{6} | — | March 18, 2001 | Anderson Mesa | LONEOS | AMO | 750 m | MPC · JPL |
| 171820 | 2001 FT_{12} | — | March 19, 2001 | Anderson Mesa | LONEOS | · | 2.5 km | MPC · JPL |
| 171821 | 2001 FW_{14} | — | March 19, 2001 | Anderson Mesa | LONEOS | MAS | 820 m | MPC · JPL |
| 171822 | 2001 FR_{20} | — | March 19, 2001 | Anderson Mesa | LONEOS | · | 2.7 km | MPC · JPL |
| 171823 | 2001 FS_{25} | — | March 18, 2001 | Socorro | LINEAR | · | 2.1 km | MPC · JPL |
| 171824 | 2001 FK_{49} | — | March 18, 2001 | Socorro | LINEAR | MAS | 930 m | MPC · JPL |
| 171825 | 2001 FQ_{63} | — | March 19, 2001 | Socorro | LINEAR | MAS | 1.4 km | MPC · JPL |
| 171826 | 2001 FZ_{82} | — | March 24, 2001 | Socorro | LINEAR | · | 1.5 km | MPC · JPL |
| 171827 | 2001 FE_{92} | — | March 16, 2001 | Socorro | LINEAR | · | 3.2 km | MPC · JPL |
| 171828 | 2001 FD_{103} | — | March 18, 2001 | Socorro | LINEAR | ERI | 3.5 km | MPC · JPL |
| 171829 | 2001 FY_{105} | — | March 18, 2001 | Anderson Mesa | LONEOS | · | 1.5 km | MPC · JPL |
| 171830 | 2001 FV_{109} | — | March 18, 2001 | Socorro | LINEAR | · | 2.0 km | MPC · JPL |
| 171831 | 2001 FO_{145} | — | March 24, 2001 | Kitt Peak | Spacewatch | · | 2.1 km | MPC · JPL |
| 171832 | 2001 FO_{152} | — | March 26, 2001 | Socorro | LINEAR | · | 1.7 km | MPC · JPL |
| 171833 | 2001 FA_{161} | — | March 29, 2001 | Haleakala | NEAT | · | 3.4 km | MPC · JPL |
| 171834 | 2001 FR_{173} | — | March 21, 2001 | Kitt Peak | Spacewatch | · | 1.7 km | MPC · JPL |
| 171835 | 2001 GO_{8} | — | April 15, 2001 | Socorro | LINEAR | · | 4.1 km | MPC · JPL |
| 171836 | 2001 HJ_{41} | — | April 27, 2001 | Socorro | LINEAR | · | 2.8 km | MPC · JPL |
| 171837 | 2001 HQ_{52} | — | April 23, 2001 | Socorro | LINEAR | · | 2.7 km | MPC · JPL |
| 171838 | 2001 HE_{56} | — | April 24, 2001 | Socorro | LINEAR | · | 1.8 km | MPC · JPL |
| 171839 | 2001 JM_{1} | — | May 12, 2001 | Haleakala | NEAT | AMO · APO · PHA | 510 m | MPC · JPL |
| 171840 | 2001 JY_{7} | — | May 15, 2001 | Anderson Mesa | LONEOS | · | 2.2 km | MPC · JPL |
| 171841 | 2001 JK_{10} | — | May 15, 2001 | Anderson Mesa | LONEOS | · | 3.2 km | MPC · JPL |
| 171842 | 2001 KD_{10} | — | May 18, 2001 | Socorro | LINEAR | · | 2.8 km | MPC · JPL |
| 171843 | 2001 KW_{21} | — | May 17, 2001 | Socorro | LINEAR | · | 4.8 km | MPC · JPL |
| 171844 | 2001 KM_{29} | — | May 21, 2001 | Socorro | LINEAR | (194) | 2.6 km | MPC · JPL |
| 171845 | 2001 KV_{33} | — | May 18, 2001 | Socorro | LINEAR | · | 1.9 km | MPC · JPL |
| 171846 | 2001 KW_{36} | — | May 21, 2001 | Socorro | LINEAR | · | 3.3 km | MPC · JPL |
| 171847 | 2001 KK_{45} | — | May 22, 2001 | Socorro | LINEAR | EUN | 2.6 km | MPC · JPL |
| 171848 | 2001 KV_{56} | — | May 23, 2001 | Socorro | LINEAR | · | 2.5 km | MPC · JPL |
| 171849 | 2001 KW_{72} | — | May 24, 2001 | Kitt Peak | Spacewatch | · | 2.4 km | MPC · JPL |
| 171850 | 2001 LN_{15} | — | June 12, 2001 | Anderson Mesa | LONEOS | · | 4.4 km | MPC · JPL |
| 171851 | 2001 MG | — | June 16, 2001 | Desert Beaver | W. K. Y. Yeung | · | 3.9 km | MPC · JPL |
| 171852 | 2001 MY_{3} | — | June 16, 2001 | Socorro | LINEAR | · | 1.9 km | MPC · JPL |
| 171853 | 2001 MN_{17} | — | June 26, 2001 | Kitt Peak | Spacewatch | HNS | 2.0 km | MPC · JPL |
| 171854 | 2001 MB_{20} | — | June 25, 2001 | Palomar | NEAT | · | 2.1 km | MPC · JPL |
| 171855 | 2001 MR_{20} | — | June 25, 2001 | Palomar | NEAT | MRX | 1.6 km | MPC · JPL |
| 171856 | 2001 NM_{5} | — | July 13, 2001 | Palomar | NEAT | · | 2.3 km | MPC · JPL |
| 171857 | 2001 OF_{12} | — | July 20, 2001 | Palomar | NEAT | · | 4.5 km | MPC · JPL |
| 171858 | 2001 OO_{42} | — | July 22, 2001 | Palomar | NEAT | · | 2.9 km | MPC · JPL |
| 171859 | 2001 OH_{51} | — | July 21, 2001 | Palomar | NEAT | · | 3.0 km | MPC · JPL |
| 171860 | 2001 OM_{93} | — | July 25, 2001 | Haleakala | NEAT | · | 3.4 km | MPC · JPL |
| 171861 | 2001 OP_{102} | — | July 28, 2001 | Haleakala | NEAT | · | 5.0 km | MPC · JPL |
| 171862 | 2001 PG_{49} | — | August 13, 2001 | Palomar | NEAT | · | 6.7 km | MPC · JPL |
| 171863 | 2001 QK_{3} | — | August 16, 2001 | Socorro | LINEAR | · | 3.6 km | MPC · JPL |
| 171864 | 2001 QU_{52} | — | August 16, 2001 | Socorro | LINEAR | · | 3.7 km | MPC · JPL |
| 171865 | 2001 QQ_{72} | — | August 16, 2001 | Palomar | NEAT | · | 6.5 km | MPC · JPL |
| 171866 | 2001 QV_{72} | — | August 20, 2001 | Palomar | NEAT | · | 6.4 km | MPC · JPL |
| 171867 | 2001 QA_{97} | — | August 17, 2001 | Socorro | LINEAR | · | 5.2 km | MPC · JPL |
| 171868 | 2001 QR_{110} | — | August 24, 2001 | Ondřejov | P. Kušnirák, P. Pravec | · | 2.7 km | MPC · JPL |
| 171869 | 2001 QD_{119} | — | August 17, 2001 | Socorro | LINEAR | · | 3.6 km | MPC · JPL |
| 171870 | 2001 QJ_{125} | — | August 19, 2001 | Socorro | LINEAR | · | 4.1 km | MPC · JPL |
| 171871 | 2001 QD_{157} | — | August 23, 2001 | Anderson Mesa | LONEOS | EOS | 3.8 km | MPC · JPL |
| 171872 | 2001 QJ_{171} | — | August 25, 2001 | Socorro | LINEAR | · | 5.9 km | MPC · JPL |
| 171873 | 2001 QF_{197} | — | August 22, 2001 | Palomar | NEAT | · | 5.7 km | MPC · JPL |
| 171874 | 2001 QR_{211} | — | August 23, 2001 | Anderson Mesa | LONEOS | · | 3.2 km | MPC · JPL |
| 171875 | 2001 QX_{219} | — | August 23, 2001 | Socorro | LINEAR | · | 6.4 km | MPC · JPL |
| 171876 | 2001 QE_{228} | — | August 24, 2001 | Anderson Mesa | LONEOS | EOS | 2.8 km | MPC · JPL |
| 171877 | 2001 QR_{228} | — | August 24, 2001 | Anderson Mesa | LONEOS | EOS | 3.2 km | MPC · JPL |
| 171878 | 2001 QY_{261} | — | August 25, 2001 | Socorro | LINEAR | · | 3.9 km | MPC · JPL |
| 171879 | 2001 QQ_{263} | — | August 25, 2001 | Socorro | LINEAR | · | 5.8 km | MPC · JPL |
| 171880 | 2001 QV_{274} | — | August 19, 2001 | Socorro | LINEAR | · | 4.9 km | MPC · JPL |
| 171881 | 2001 QR_{285} | — | August 23, 2001 | Haleakala | NEAT | · | 3.3 km | MPC · JPL |
| 171882 | 2001 QW_{290} | — | August 16, 2001 | Socorro | LINEAR | THM | 3.5 km | MPC · JPL |
| 171883 | 2001 QH_{328} | — | August 26, 2001 | Palomar | NEAT | · | 7.6 km | MPC · JPL |
| 171884 | 2001 QC_{329} | — | August 16, 2001 | Socorro | LINEAR | · | 2.5 km | MPC · JPL |
| 171885 | 2001 QL_{333} | — | August 20, 2001 | Palomar | NEAT | · | 6.2 km | MPC · JPL |
| 171886 | 2001 RE_{12} | — | September 9, 2001 | Anderson Mesa | LONEOS | EOS | 5.2 km | MPC · JPL |
| 171887 | 2001 RG_{15} | — | September 10, 2001 | Socorro | LINEAR | · | 4.0 km | MPC · JPL |
| 171888 | 2001 RJ_{20} | — | September 7, 2001 | Socorro | LINEAR | · | 2.6 km | MPC · JPL |
| 171889 | 2001 RJ_{31} | — | September 7, 2001 | Socorro | LINEAR | HOF | 5.6 km | MPC · JPL |
| 171890 | 2001 RL_{42} | — | September 11, 2001 | Socorro | LINEAR | EOS | 2.8 km | MPC · JPL |
| 171891 | 2001 RW_{46} | — | September 11, 2001 | Socorro | LINEAR | · | 7.3 km | MPC · JPL |
| 171892 | 2001 RT_{48} | — | September 11, 2001 | Socorro | LINEAR | EUP | 5.9 km | MPC · JPL |
| 171893 | 2001 RS_{67} | — | September 10, 2001 | Socorro | LINEAR | · | 4.2 km | MPC · JPL |
| 171894 | 2001 RP_{83} | — | September 11, 2001 | Anderson Mesa | LONEOS | · | 4.3 km | MPC · JPL |
| 171895 | 2001 RG_{85} | — | September 11, 2001 | Anderson Mesa | LONEOS | · | 4.3 km | MPC · JPL |
| 171896 | 2001 RG_{89} | — | September 11, 2001 | Anderson Mesa | LONEOS | THM | 3.0 km | MPC · JPL |
| 171897 | 2001 RQ_{89} | — | September 11, 2001 | Anderson Mesa | LONEOS | · | 4.1 km | MPC · JPL |
| 171898 | 2001 RZ_{90} | — | September 11, 2001 | Anderson Mesa | LONEOS | · | 3.4 km | MPC · JPL |
| 171899 | 2001 RP_{96} | — | September 12, 2001 | Kitt Peak | Spacewatch | · | 2.6 km | MPC · JPL |
| 171900 | 2001 RW_{102} | — | September 12, 2001 | Socorro | LINEAR | · | 3.0 km | MPC · JPL |

== 171901–172000 ==
back to top

| Designation | | | Discovery | | | Properties | | Ref |
| Permanent | Provisional | Named after | Date | Site | Discoverer(s) | Category | Diam. | Ref |
|---|---|---|---|---|---|---|---|---|
| 171901 | 2001 RK_{104} | — | September 12, 2001 | Socorro | LINEAR | · | 3.6 km | MPC · JPL |
| 171902 | 2001 RH_{129} | — | September 12, 2001 | Socorro | LINEAR | · | 4.3 km | MPC · JPL |
| 171903 | 2001 RX_{131} | — | September 12, 2001 | Socorro | LINEAR | · | 2.9 km | MPC · JPL |
| 171904 | 2001 RG_{150} | — | September 11, 2001 | Anderson Mesa | LONEOS | · | 3.0 km | MPC · JPL |
| 171905 | 2001 SK_{12} | — | September 16, 2001 | Socorro | LINEAR | · | 2.9 km | MPC · JPL |
| 171906 | 2001 SZ_{24} | — | September 16, 2001 | Socorro | LINEAR | HYG | 3.5 km | MPC · JPL |
| 171907 | 2001 ST_{31} | — | September 16, 2001 | Socorro | LINEAR | · | 3.6 km | MPC · JPL |
| 171908 | 2001 SW_{32} | — | September 16, 2001 | Socorro | LINEAR | · | 3.5 km | MPC · JPL |
| 171909 | 2001 SK_{44} | — | September 16, 2001 | Socorro | LINEAR | · | 4.6 km | MPC · JPL |
| 171910 | 2001 SZ_{45} | — | September 16, 2001 | Socorro | LINEAR | · | 4.3 km | MPC · JPL |
| 171911 | 2001 SD_{51} | — | September 16, 2001 | Socorro | LINEAR | · | 4.5 km | MPC · JPL |
| 171912 | 2001 SB_{62} | — | September 17, 2001 | Socorro | LINEAR | · | 4.4 km | MPC · JPL |
| 171913 | 2001 SA_{74} | — | September 19, 2001 | Anderson Mesa | LONEOS | · | 4.6 km | MPC · JPL |
| 171914 | 2001 SM_{75} | — | September 19, 2001 | Anderson Mesa | LONEOS | · | 6.0 km | MPC · JPL |
| 171915 | 2001 SX_{83} | — | September 20, 2001 | Socorro | LINEAR | · | 5.3 km | MPC · JPL |
| 171916 | 2001 SN_{90} | — | September 20, 2001 | Socorro | LINEAR | KOR | 2.3 km | MPC · JPL |
| 171917 | 2001 SA_{96} | — | September 20, 2001 | Socorro | LINEAR | · | 3.1 km | MPC · JPL |
| 171918 | 2001 SF_{100} | — | September 20, 2001 | Socorro | LINEAR | EOS | 4.1 km | MPC · JPL |
| 171919 | 2001 SG_{115} | — | September 20, 2001 | Desert Eagle | W. K. Y. Yeung | · | 2.8 km | MPC · JPL |
| 171920 | 2001 SN_{117} | — | September 16, 2001 | Socorro | LINEAR | · | 2.8 km | MPC · JPL |
| 171921 | 2001 SF_{127} | — | September 16, 2001 | Socorro | LINEAR | · | 6.8 km | MPC · JPL |
| 171922 | 2001 SM_{139} | — | September 16, 2001 | Socorro | LINEAR | · | 5.2 km | MPC · JPL |
| 171923 | 2001 SZ_{140} | — | September 16, 2001 | Socorro | LINEAR | · | 4.6 km | MPC · JPL |
| 171924 | 2001 SP_{142} | — | September 16, 2001 | Socorro | LINEAR | HYG | 4.1 km | MPC · JPL |
| 171925 | 2001 ST_{143} | — | September 16, 2001 | Socorro | LINEAR | · | 4.4 km | MPC · JPL |
| 171926 | 2001 SW_{143} | — | September 16, 2001 | Socorro | LINEAR | AGN | 2.2 km | MPC · JPL |
| 171927 | 2001 SW_{145} | — | September 16, 2001 | Socorro | LINEAR | · | 5.3 km | MPC · JPL |
| 171928 | 2001 SK_{153} | — | September 17, 2001 | Socorro | LINEAR | · | 4.8 km | MPC · JPL |
| 171929 | 2001 SQ_{158} | — | September 17, 2001 | Socorro | LINEAR | · | 5.0 km | MPC · JPL |
| 171930 | 2001 SJ_{170} | — | September 16, 2001 | Socorro | LINEAR | · | 3.1 km | MPC · JPL |
| 171931 | 2001 SP_{174} | — | September 16, 2001 | Socorro | LINEAR | · | 2.5 km | MPC · JPL |
| 171932 | 2001 SD_{198} | — | September 19, 2001 | Socorro | LINEAR | · | 6.3 km | MPC · JPL |
| 171933 | 2001 SN_{201} | — | September 19, 2001 | Socorro | LINEAR | EOS | 3.1 km | MPC · JPL |
| 171934 | 2001 SL_{213} | — | September 19, 2001 | Socorro | LINEAR | · | 2.4 km | MPC · JPL |
| 171935 | 2001 SJ_{223} | — | September 19, 2001 | Socorro | LINEAR | · | 2.7 km | MPC · JPL |
| 171936 | 2001 SH_{226} | — | September 19, 2001 | Socorro | LINEAR | THM | 3.7 km | MPC · JPL |
| 171937 | 2001 SA_{231} | — | September 19, 2001 | Socorro | LINEAR | · | 4.1 km | MPC · JPL |
| 171938 | 2001 SS_{232} | — | September 19, 2001 | Socorro | LINEAR | · | 4.2 km | MPC · JPL |
| 171939 | 2001 SH_{235} | — | September 19, 2001 | Socorro | LINEAR | · | 5.4 km | MPC · JPL |
| 171940 | 2001 SK_{240} | — | September 19, 2001 | Socorro | LINEAR | · | 2.8 km | MPC · JPL |
| 171941 | 2001 SM_{241} | — | September 19, 2001 | Socorro | LINEAR | · | 5.2 km | MPC · JPL |
| 171942 | 2001 SA_{256} | — | September 19, 2001 | Socorro | LINEAR | · | 4.0 km | MPC · JPL |
| 171943 | 2001 SU_{256} | — | September 19, 2001 | Socorro | LINEAR | · | 4.8 km | MPC · JPL |
| 171944 | 2001 SM_{260} | — | September 20, 2001 | Socorro | LINEAR | EOS | 4.1 km | MPC · JPL |
| 171945 | 2001 SP_{270} | — | September 25, 2001 | Desert Eagle | W. K. Y. Yeung | VER | 4.9 km | MPC · JPL |
| 171946 | 2001 SB_{281} | — | September 21, 2001 | Anderson Mesa | LONEOS | · | 4.8 km | MPC · JPL |
| 171947 | 2001 SK_{281} | — | September 21, 2001 | Anderson Mesa | LONEOS | HYG | 4.5 km | MPC · JPL |
| 171948 | 2001 SJ_{288} | — | September 27, 2001 | Palomar | NEAT | LIX | 5.3 km | MPC · JPL |
| 171949 | 2001 SP_{313} | — | September 21, 2001 | Socorro | LINEAR | EOS | 3.7 km | MPC · JPL |
| 171950 | 2001 SY_{317} | — | September 19, 2001 | Socorro | LINEAR | · | 3.1 km | MPC · JPL |
| 171951 | 2001 SS_{328} | — | September 19, 2001 | Anderson Mesa | LONEOS | KOR | 2.3 km | MPC · JPL |
| 171952 | 2001 SD_{340} | — | September 21, 2001 | Anderson Mesa | LONEOS | ADE | 5.0 km | MPC · JPL |
| 171953 | 2001 SN_{345} | — | September 23, 2001 | Palomar | NEAT | · | 3.9 km | MPC · JPL |
| 171954 | 2001 SE_{348} | — | September 26, 2001 | Socorro | LINEAR | · | 4.7 km | MPC · JPL |
| 171955 | 2001 SH_{350} | — | September 20, 2001 | Socorro | LINEAR | · | 5.9 km | MPC · JPL |
| 171956 | 2001 TO_{10} | — | October 13, 2001 | Socorro | LINEAR | THM | 3.1 km | MPC · JPL |
| 171957 | 2001 TR_{11} | — | October 13, 2001 | Socorro | LINEAR | · | 4.0 km | MPC · JPL |
| 171958 | 2001 TJ_{31} | — | October 14, 2001 | Socorro | LINEAR | EOS | 3.0 km | MPC · JPL |
| 171959 | 2001 TG_{61} | — | October 13, 2001 | Socorro | LINEAR | · | 4.1 km | MPC · JPL |
| 171960 | 2001 TO_{64} | — | October 13, 2001 | Socorro | LINEAR | THM | 3.5 km | MPC · JPL |
| 171961 | 2001 TR_{81} | — | October 14, 2001 | Socorro | LINEAR | · | 3.9 km | MPC · JPL |
| 171962 | 2001 TP_{82} | — | October 14, 2001 | Socorro | LINEAR | · | 4.1 km | MPC · JPL |
| 171963 | 2001 TR_{84} | — | October 14, 2001 | Socorro | LINEAR | EOS · | 5.8 km | MPC · JPL |
| 171964 | 2001 TV_{87} | — | October 14, 2001 | Socorro | LINEAR | · | 5.0 km | MPC · JPL |
| 171965 | 2001 TZ_{89} | — | October 14, 2001 | Socorro | LINEAR | · | 6.1 km | MPC · JPL |
| 171966 | 2001 TH_{93} | — | October 14, 2001 | Socorro | LINEAR | EMA | 5.4 km | MPC · JPL |
| 171967 | 2001 TY_{100} | — | October 14, 2001 | Socorro | LINEAR | · | 4.6 km | MPC · JPL |
| 171968 | 2001 TF_{108} | — | October 14, 2001 | Socorro | LINEAR | · | 5.6 km | MPC · JPL |
| 171969 | 2001 TH_{109} | — | October 14, 2001 | Socorro | LINEAR | · | 5.4 km | MPC · JPL |
| 171970 | 2001 TJ_{118} | — | October 15, 2001 | Socorro | LINEAR | · | 6.5 km | MPC · JPL |
| 171971 | 2001 TN_{121} | — | October 15, 2001 | Socorro | LINEAR | EOS | 3.3 km | MPC · JPL |
| 171972 | 2001 TU_{121} | — | October 15, 2001 | Socorro | LINEAR | · | 6.3 km | MPC · JPL |
| 171973 | 2001 TO_{122} | — | October 15, 2001 | Socorro | LINEAR | EUP | 6.5 km | MPC · JPL |
| 171974 | 2001 TM_{124} | — | October 12, 2001 | Haleakala | NEAT | EOS | 3.4 km | MPC · JPL |
| 171975 | 2001 TY_{127} | — | October 10, 2001 | Palomar | NEAT | · | 4.5 km | MPC · JPL |
| 171976 | 2001 TP_{128} | — | October 13, 2001 | Palomar | NEAT | (8737) | 4.2 km | MPC · JPL |
| 171977 | 2001 TO_{134} | — | October 13, 2001 | Palomar | NEAT | · | 3.9 km | MPC · JPL |
| 171978 | 2001 TR_{135} | — | October 13, 2001 | Palomar | NEAT | LIX | 5.3 km | MPC · JPL |
| 171979 | 2001 TW_{135} | — | October 13, 2001 | Palomar | NEAT | · | 5.1 km | MPC · JPL |
| 171980 | 2001 TO_{145} | — | October 10, 2001 | Palomar | NEAT | · | 8.0 km | MPC · JPL |
| 171981 | 2001 TB_{150} | — | October 10, 2001 | Palomar | NEAT | · | 4.7 km | MPC · JPL |
| 171982 | 2001 TP_{152} | — | October 10, 2001 | Palomar | NEAT | LIX | 6.6 km | MPC · JPL |
| 171983 | 2001 TX_{161} | — | October 11, 2001 | Palomar | NEAT | · | 2.9 km | MPC · JPL |
| 171984 | 2001 TQ_{175} | — | October 14, 2001 | Socorro | LINEAR | HYG | 3.3 km | MPC · JPL |
| 171985 | 2001 TB_{184} | — | October 14, 2001 | Socorro | LINEAR | EOS | 3.1 km | MPC · JPL |
| 171986 | 2001 TX_{188} | — | October 14, 2001 | Socorro | LINEAR | HYG | 9.4 km | MPC · JPL |
| 171987 | 2001 TZ_{200} | — | October 11, 2001 | Socorro | LINEAR | · | 5.4 km | MPC · JPL |
| 171988 | 2001 TB_{202} | — | October 11, 2001 | Socorro | LINEAR | · | 4.0 km | MPC · JPL |
| 171989 | 2001 TS_{203} | — | October 11, 2001 | Socorro | LINEAR | LIX | 7.1 km | MPC · JPL |
| 171990 | 2001 TY_{208} | — | October 12, 2001 | Anderson Mesa | LONEOS | · | 6.4 km | MPC · JPL |
| 171991 | 2001 TP_{210} | — | October 13, 2001 | Palomar | NEAT | EOS | 3.5 km | MPC · JPL |
| 171992 | 2001 TK_{214} | — | October 13, 2001 | Palomar | NEAT | · | 4.6 km | MPC · JPL |
| 171993 | 2001 TS_{214} | — | October 13, 2001 | Palomar | NEAT | · | 4.7 km | MPC · JPL |
| 171994 | 2001 TZ_{218} | — | October 14, 2001 | Anderson Mesa | LONEOS | · | 4.6 km | MPC · JPL |
| 171995 | 2001 TJ_{235} | — | October 15, 2001 | Haleakala | NEAT | · | 3.1 km | MPC · JPL |
| 171996 | 2001 TM_{238} | — | October 15, 2001 | Palomar | NEAT | · | 4.6 km | MPC · JPL |
| 171997 | 2001 TW_{256} | — | October 14, 2001 | Haleakala | NEAT | TIR | 5.9 km | MPC · JPL |
| 171998 | 2001 UM_{3} | — | October 16, 2001 | Socorro | LINEAR | HYG | 5.6 km | MPC · JPL |
| 171999 | 2001 UQ_{21} | — | October 17, 2001 | Socorro | LINEAR | · | 5.4 km | MPC · JPL |
| 172000 | 2001 UO_{22} | — | October 17, 2001 | Socorro | LINEAR | TEL | 2.9 km | MPC · JPL |

back to top

== See also ==
- Meanings of minor-planet names: 171001–172000
