= Meanings of minor-planet names: 171001–172000 =

As minor planet discoveries are confirmed, they are given a permanent number by the IAU's Minor Planet Center (MPC), and the discoverers can then submit names for them, following the IAU's naming conventions. The list below concerns those minor planets in the specified number-range that have received names, and explains the meanings of those names.

Official naming citations of newly named small Solar System bodies are approved and published in a bulletin by IAU's Working Group for Small Bodies Nomenclature (WGSBN). Before May 2021, citations were published in MPC's Minor Planet Circulars for many decades. Recent citations can also be found on the JPL Small-Body Database (SBDB). Until his death in 2016, German astronomer Lutz D. Schmadel compiled these citations into the Dictionary of Minor Planet Names (DMP) and regularly updated the collection.

Based on Paul Herget's The Names of the Minor Planets, Schmadel also researched the unclear origin of numerous asteroids, most of which had been named prior to World War II. This article incorporates text from this source, which is in the public domain: SBDB New namings may only be added to this list below after official publication as the preannouncement of names is condemned. The WGSBN publishes a comprehensive guideline for the naming rules of non-cometary small Solar System bodies.

== 171001–171100 ==
Named minor planet	Provisional	This minor planet was named for...	Ref · Catalog
There are no named minor planets in this number range

== 171101–171200 ==
back to top

Named minor planet	Provisional	This minor planet was named for...	Ref · Catalog
171112 Sickafoose	2005 ER_{301}	J. Lorin (born 1944) and Tanalynne Sickafoose (1945–2006), parents of the discoverer Amanda Sickafoose Gulbis	JPL · 171112
171118 Szigetköz	2005 GJ_{1}	Szigetköz, a beautiful island plain in western Hungary, part of the Little Hungarian Plain	JPL · 171118
171153 Allanrahill	2005 GL_{81}	Allan Rahill (born 1958), meteorologist at the Canadian Meteorological Centre	JPL · 171153
171171 Prior	2005 GZ_{164}	Richard M. Prior (born 1942), a professor of physics who earned a PhD. in Nuclear Physics at the University of Florida	JPL · 171171
171183 Haleakala	2005 HJ_{4}	Haleakala (Hawaiian for the house of the sun), high dormant volcano on the island of Maui	JPL · 171183
171195 Richardgreen	2005 JY_{30}	Richard F. Green (born 1949), American astronomer at the University of Arizona.	JPL · 171195

== 171201–171300 ==
back to top

Named minor planet	Provisional	This minor planet was named for...	Ref · Catalog
171256 Lucieconstant	2005 PU_{5}	Lucie Constant (born 1983), goddaughter of French discoverer Bernard Christophe	JPL · 171256

== 171301–171400 ==
back to top

Named minor planet	Provisional	This minor planet was named for...	Ref · Catalog
171381 Taipei	2006 OG_{17}	Taipei, known officially as Taipei City, is the political, economic and cultural center of Taiwan.	JPL · 171381
171396 Miguel	2006 QH_{33}	Miguel Lacruz Martín (born 1963), Spanish mathematician at Kent State University	JPL · 171396

== 171401–171500 ==
back to top

Named minor planet	Provisional	This minor planet was named for...	Ref · Catalog
171424 Rudyfernández	2007 NL_{2}	Rodolfo ‘Rudy’ Fernandez Farrs (b. 1985), a Spanish basketball player for Real Madrid.	IAU · 171424
171429 Hunstead	2007 RD_{5}	Richard W. Hunstead (1943–2020), Australian astronomer	JPL · 171429
171433 Prothous	2007 RK_{35}	Prothous, from Greek mythology. He is the leader of Magnesia, son of Tenthredon, was one of the suitors of Helen of Troy	JPL · 171433
171448 Guchaohao	2007 RD_{147}	Gu Chaohao (1926–2012), a Chinese mathematician who has made contributions to both pure and applied mathematics, and member of the Chinese Academy of Sciences	JPL · 171448
171458 Pepaprats	2007 TF_{14}	Pepa Prats Cruz (1964–2008), deceased wife of the astrophysicist José Luis Ortiz Moreno, uncredited co-discoverer of this minor planet at La Sagra Observatory	JPL · 171458
171465 Evamaria	6847 P-L	Eva Maria Schubart (1919–2008), teacher of languages in the southern U.S.	JPL · 171465

== 171501–171600 ==
back to top

Named minor planet	Provisional	This minor planet was named for...	Ref · Catalog
171588 Náprstek	1999 WG_{1}	Vojta Náprstek (1826–1894), Czech philanthropist and advocate of progressive ideas	JPL · 171588

== 171601–171700 ==
back to top

Named minor planet	Provisional	This minor planet was named for...	Ref · Catalog
171624 Nicolemartin	2000 CT_{106}	Nicole P. Martin (born 1973) served as a Pluto flyby sequencer for the New Horizons mission to Pluto.	JPL · 171624

== 171701–171800 ==
back to top

Named minor planet	Provisional	This minor planet was named for...	Ref · Catalog
There are no named minor planets in this number range

== 171801–171900 ==
back to top

Named minor planet	Provisional	This minor planet was named for...	Ref · Catalog
There are no named minor planets in this number range

== 171901–172000 ==
back to top

Named minor planet	Provisional	This minor planet was named for...	Ref · Catalog
There are no named minor planets in this number range

back to top

Preceded by 170,001–171,000	Meanings of minor-planet names List of minor planets: 171,001–172,000	Succeeded by 172,001–173,000
