= Eleanor E. Orlebar =

English writer (1841–1906)

- Born: Eleanor Edith Orlebar; 1841; Nottingham, England
- Died: 23 January 1906 (aged 65); Worthing, England
- Occupations: Novelist; cookbook writer
- Relatives: William Henry Giles Kingston (uncle); George Kingston (uncle); Giles Rooke (great-grandfather)
- Writing career
- Period: 1878–1879

Eleanor Edith Orlebar (1841 – 23 January 1906) was an English novelist and cookbook writer. Her published works include the historical novel Sancta Christina: A Story of the First Century (1878) and the vegetarian cookbook Food for the People; or, Lentils and other Vegetable Cookery (1879).

== Biography ==
=== Early life and family ===
Eleanor Edith Orlebar was born in Nottingham in 1841, the daughter of the Rev. Cuthbert Orlebar (d. 1861) and Eleanor Orlebar (née Kingston). Her father had been vicar of Podington. Her mother was also a writer, whose works included Cinderella, a Fairy Tale in Verse (1848) and the novel Frank Bennet: A Story of the Stocking-Loom and of the Lace-Frame in 1811 (1869).

Orlebar had two brothers and two sisters. Her maternal uncles included the children's writer William Henry Giles Kingston and the meteorologist George Kingston. Her maternal great-grandfather was Giles Rooke, a justice of the Court of Common Pleas, and her great-great-grandfather was Valentine Knightley.

=== Writing ===
In 1878, Orlebar published the historical novel Sancta Christina: A Story of the First Century, with a preface by the Bishop of Winchester. Set in first-century Etruria, the novel depicts the spread of early Christianity. The Bulletin of the Public Library of the City of Boston described it as a "story illustrating the growth of early Christianity in Etruria during the first century."

In 1879, Orlebar published Food for the People; or, Lentils and other Vegetable Cookery, a vegetarian cookbook containing recipes for lentils and other vegetable-based dishes. Her interest in the subject followed letters published in The Times by William Gibson Ward, a vice-president of the Vegetarian Society, advocating the use of lentils as an inexpensive food. The cookbook reproduced a letter Ward had sent to Orlebar on 14 January 1879.

Orlebar also discussed vegetarian restaurants as a possible source of employment for unmarried middle-class women, offering an alternative to work as a governess, although she was critical of such establishments.

In The Oxford Companion to Food, Alan Davidson described Food for the People as "one of the most eccentric, and endearing, food books of the 19th century". He also remarked on Orlebar's knowledge of classical studies, persuasive writing and attention to detail.

=== Death ===
Orlebar died on 23 January 1906 at the Home of the Holy Rood in Worthing, aged 65.

== Publications ==
- Sancta Christina: A Story of the First Century (London: Sampson Low, 1878)
- Food for the People; or, Lentils and other Vegetable Cookery (London: Sampson Low, 1879)
