= William Winterbotham =

British Baptist minister and political prisoner

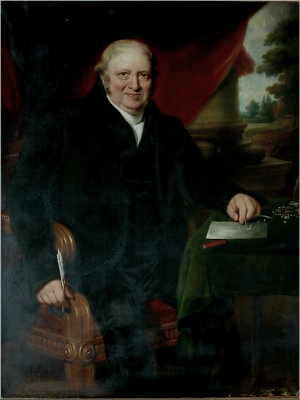
- Portrait of Rev. William Winterbotham, painted by John Ponsford of Devon, Summer 1828.
- Born: 15 December 1763; Little Minories, Aldgate, London
- Died: 31 March 1829 (aged 65)
- Occupation: Baptist minister
- Known for: Writer

Rev. William Winterbotham (15 December 1763 – 31 March 1829) was a British Baptist minister and a political prisoner of the Pittite repression of the 1790s.

== Early life ==
He was born in Little Minories, Aldgate, London on 15 December 1763. He was a son of John Winterbotham and his wife Elizabeth Hyett. As a boy he lived for a time with his Hyett grandparents in Cheltenham. He returned to London in 1774, and about two years later was apprenticed to a silversmith. He was brought up in the Church of England, and joined the Protestant Association of 1780. Going into business as a maker of silver buckles in 1784 proved a false start.

== Evangelical conversion and ministry ==
Winterbotham accompanied his brother, converted when they had heard an African Methodist, to Pennington Street, a meeting house near Ratcliffe Highway, where a Mr Radford was preaching; Radford is identified as a Calvinistic Methodist. It was here in 1786 that he himself was converted. His parents were not happy with his views.

A lay preacher from that time, in 1789 Winterbotham was baptised in the River Thames at Old Ford and became a Baptist minister. At the end of the same year, he was asked to assist Philip Gibbs, the pastor of the Baptist church at How's Lane, Plymouth. He moved there at the start of 1790. Gibbs earlier in the mid-1780s had been a colleague of Isaiah Birt, who had then set up another church in Devonport. Winterbotham was recommended to Gibbs by William Broady, a Baptist and Highbury College student who had been offered the assistant post.

== Plymouth and the dockyards ==
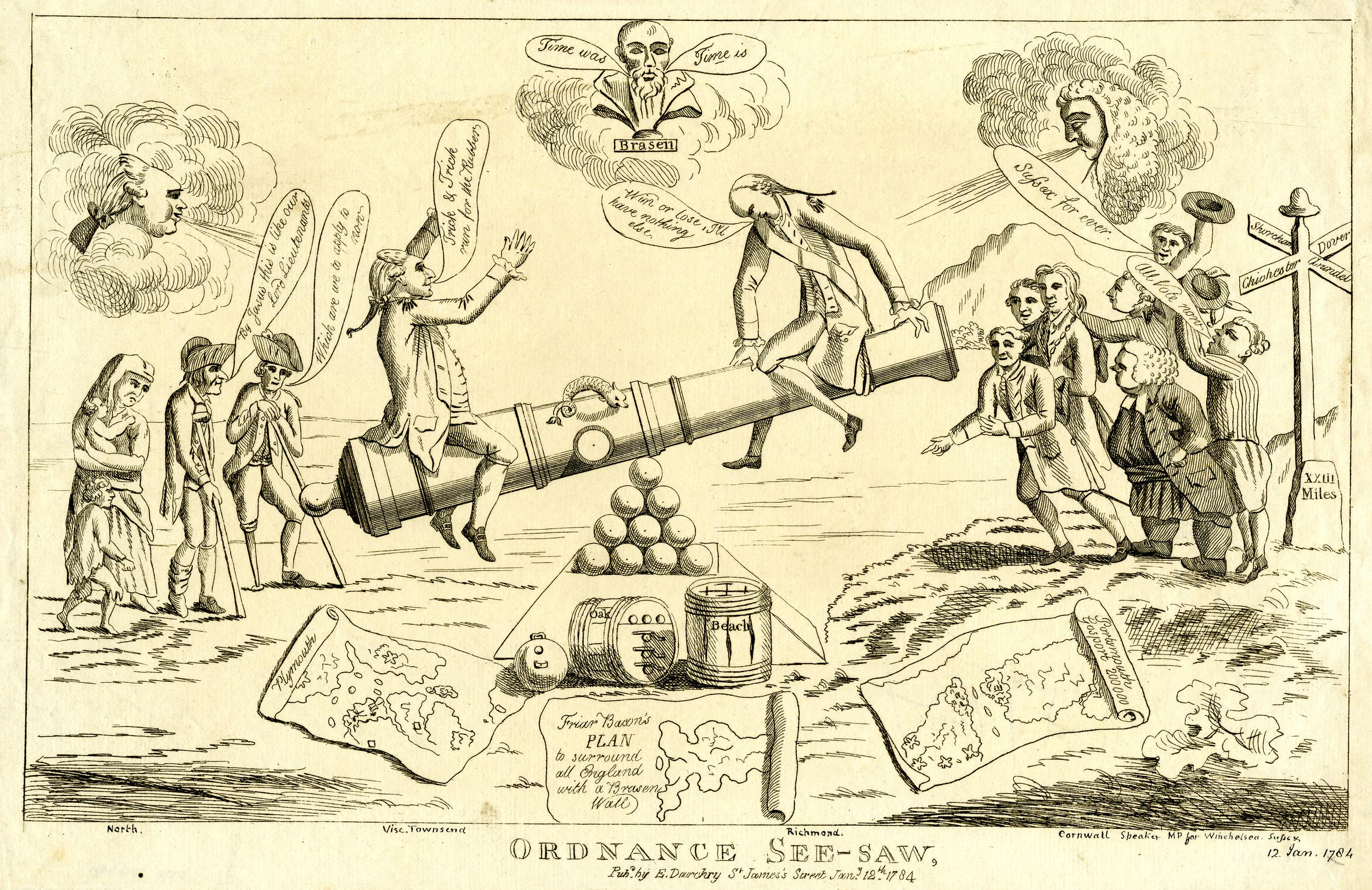
"Ordnance Seesaw", 1784 satirical print showing 3rd Duke of Richmond and fortification plans

At this period, "The spread of dissenting religion was resisted by the authorities in dockyard towns." Under Charles Lennox, 3rd Duke of Richmond as Master-General of the Ordnance, Plymouth in the 1780s saw major capital expenditure on fortifications. Then "in spite of earnings from piecework, in the 1790s some in the dockyard community still occasionally suffered from distress. Fluctuating food prices, on top of long-term inflation, brought periods of severe deprivation."

== 1792 sermons and 1793 trial proceedings ==
Winterbotham preached two sermons in his Plymouth meeting house in November 1792, the first on 5 November being on Exodus xiii:8. The second, on 18 November, was intended to correct misapprehensions about the first. Its text was Romans xiii:12. In December, William Crees, Mayor of Plymouth, wrote to Henry Dundas, Secretary of State for the Home Department, with two accounts of Winterbotham's preaching, from an excise clerk and a midshipman.

Behind Winterbotham's prosecution for sedition was the attorney William Foot of Plymouth and Bere Alston. Winterbotham was, for each, fined £100 and jailed for two years. While in prison he published in 1794 redacted texts of the sermons. He was released in 1797.

=== Trials ===
Two trials took place at Exeter Assizes before Sir Richard Perryn, on successive days. In both cases the juries showed prejudice against Winterbotham.

The first trial, with a special jury, was held at Exeter on 25 July 1793. The proceedings were taken down in shorthand by William Bowring (1765/6–1827), a local attorney. Leading counsel prosecuting for the Crown was Giles Rooke. He was supported by Soulden Lawrence; with Mr Morris; Mr Fanshaw and Mr Clapp. The Crown's solicitors were Elford & Foot of Plymouth Dock. John Campbell, 1st Baron Campbell in a biography of Rooke commented on the sermons at Plymouth that "as connected to the French Revolution" they were "considered especially dangerous".

Counsel for the defendant were Vicary Gibbs, with Mr East and Mr Dampier. Solicitor – Mr John Saunders of Plymouth. The prosecution witnesses were inconsistent, one of the points mentioned by the judge in summing up, who indicated the importance of whether Winterbotham's works were intended as incitement to sedition. The defendant was found guilty by the jury after two and a half hours deliberation.

Winterbotham's second appearance was before Perryn on 26 July 1793 for the sermon preached on 18 November 1792.

There was a further hearing, in November of the same year, in the Court of King's Bench, before William Henry Ashhurst.

=== Joseph Priestley in the aftermath ===
Joseph Priestley wrote in December 1793 to John Wilkinson of Winterbotham's case that "It shews that no man who is obnoxious, however innocent, is safe." At the time Priestley was still in England, but becoming reconciled to emigration to the United states, affected by the Winterbotham trials and those of other reformers recently sentenced. Before making the voyage to America, Priestley visited Winterbotham in prison; and in delivering his fast sermon of April 1794 he had the text printed to avoid misrepresentation. In his previous fast sermon of February at the Gravel Pit Chapel, Priestley had exhorted "friends of liberty, especially among the Dissenters" to support Winterbotham and Thomas Fyshe Palmer.

== In Newgate ==
Winterbotham was sent to London's New Prison in Clerkenwell, as specified in his sentence by Ashhurst. He was then permitted to move to Newgate Prison, where he was segregated from common criminals, and encountered a group of political literati and publicists connected to the book trade.

During his time in prison, Winterbotham had a number of noted visitors. They included Iolo Morganwg. In April 1794 William Godwin visited both him and Joseph Gerrald. Theophilus Lindsey wrote in 1796 to John Rowe (1764–1832) in Shrewsbury after one of a series of visits, stating of Winterbotham that "with whose character and conversation I am more and more pleased and edified each time that I see him". Thomas Belsham included in his biography of Lindsey a letter from Winterbotham to him of 1802, explaining that the given names of his two eldest sons were Lindsey, and Rayner, for Elizabeth Rayner, another supporter.

=== The Wat Tyler manuscript ===
A play about Wat Tyler, a leader of the Peasants Revolt of 1381, was written by Robert Southey in 1794. It was published without his consent in 1817. When Southey tried to suppress it through Lord Eldon, he found that Winterbotham claimed rights in it, by gift in 1796 from Southey. The matter was confused, but Southey believed he had left the manuscript with James Ridgway to publish. The route to publication was explicated by John Foster in 1843, in a way that is supported by comments by James Kennedy Esdaile (died 1818): Winterbotham had lent it to two friends, one being Benjamin Stokes of Worcester, who had copied it without permission.

Explanations of the course of events depend on the Newgate "state prisoners", of whom Ridgway was one. Another was Henry Delahay Symonds. Southey, according to an affidavit by Winterbotham, arrived at Newgate with Daniel Isaac Eaton, who had been remanded to the prison but then released. Contradicting Southey's version, in which the manuscript was left in the care of Ridgway and Symonds, Winterbotham asserted it had been given in 1795 to him and Eaton. He had read the play with Daniel Holt, another inmate, but decided not to publish it.

Southey stated that he had given the manuscript to Ridgway via Robert Lovell; and that he had never met Winterbotham in Newgate. Winterbotham denied passing a manuscript to the publishers Sherwood, Neely & Jones, and his interest was in claiming copyright. A previously unknown manuscript of Wat Tyler surfaced in 1990, giving some basis for Foster's version. Contemporary scholarship therefore countenances a narrative made from partially plausible accounts.

== Later life ==
Winterbotham returned to Plymouth, replacing Gibbs on his death in 1801. He moved to the Shortwood Baptist chapel near Horsley, Gloucestershire in 1804, where he remained the minister until his death. He lived at Stroud and then from 1808 at Newmarket. He died at Newmarket on 31 March 1829. Joseph Baynes, who had been assistant minister at the Shortwood chapel, preached a funeral sermon.

== Works ==
While in prison, Winterbotham wrote An Historical, Geographical, Commercial, and Philosophical View of the American United States (1795), 4 vols, London, 2nd edition 1799).v.1, v.4 This was a work of compilation.

The Historical View was called a "monumental work" by Albert Bushnell Hart. It promoted emigration to the United States; which was supported at the time by Theophilus Lindsey, his dissenting associates Joseph Priestley and Richard Price, and also John Wesley. The 1796 American edition was heavily advertised in the Philadelphia Aurora as a reflection on the new nation. Winterbotham wrote:

While the governments of most countries in Europe are perfectly despotic, and while those which are not actually such, appear to be verging fast towards it, the government of America is making rapid strides towards perfection.

In his 1915 doctoral dissertation, Leon Fraser wrote of Winterbotham:

His account of the changes from the Articles to the Constitution is the most complete from an English hand in this period, and his criticism of the organization of the constitutional powers the most full.

Winterbotham became a major figure in the discussion of migration, as a "zealous but rather otherworldly" disciple of Gilbert Imlay. The books drew heavily on the American authors Jeremy Belknap, Manasseh Cutler and Jedediah Morse, the latter two being acknowledged by Winterbotham. The American historian Oliver Joseph Thatcher commented on the use of verbatim material: "This is largely a careful compilation, very often with the words unchanged, from contemporary sources, many of which are not now easily accessible." The Harvard Library Bulletin noted that "Jeremy Belknap found it necessary in 1796 to send a circular to the booksellers of the United States informing them that an English work being reprinted in this country infringed on his copyright."

Other works included;

- Trials of William Winterbotham for Seditious Words (1794), Winterbotham's versions of the Exeter Assizes trials, based on William Bowring's shorthand. One of the booksellers distributing the work was Benjamin Crosby, known from this time for publishing abolitionist authors; he also, a decade later, was offered the manuscript of Lady Susan by Jane Austen.
- An Historical, Geographical and Philosophical View of the Chinese Empire (1795), topical at the time of the Macartney Embassy. Winterbotham showed animus in "attacking Lord Macartney and the conduct of the embassy in China", while not being markedly hostile to China.
- A three-volume edition of the Complete Body of Doctrinal and Practical Divinity of John Gill was published under Winterbotham's name in 1796, and sold by James Ridgway and William Button of Paternoster Row.

== Abolitionist views ==
In vol. III of his View of the United American States, Winterbotham wrote of slavery "It is impossible to be temperate and to pursue this subject through the various considerations of policy, of morals, of history natural and civil." This was plagiarism from Thomas Jefferson's Notes on the State of Virginia, Query XVIII "The particular customs and manners that may happen to be received in that State?" It has been said that Winterbotham's compilation is one of the works that "transmitted Jefferson's Virginia-centered view of the Union".

Macleod comments that while Winterbotham was a clear opponent of slavery, his remarks also show concern for its impact on civil society, and display some racial prejudice against blacks.

== Family ==
On 26 November 1797 Winterbotham married Mary Brend. According to Mills the couple had four sons and two daughters; which may refer to surviving children.

The sons included:

- Rayner Winterbotham, eldest son, solicitor
- Lindsey Winterbotham (died 1871), banker at Stroud, married Sarah Ann Selfe Page; father of Henry Winterbotham. His son William Howard Winterbotham published privately for the trial centenary in 1893 The Rev. William Winterbotham: A Sketch. It was based on letters William Winterbotham wrote late in his life to his son Rayner.
- Lauriston Winterbotham (1802/3–1826), bank manager in Cheltenham
- John Brend Winterbotham (1805–1881)

Ann S. Stephens was his granddaughter.
