= Carpmael =

Carpmael is a surname. Notable people with the surname include:

- Charles Carpmael (1846–1894), British-Canadian meteorologist and astronomer
- Farn Carpmael (1908–1988), English rower
- William Percy Carpmael (1864–1936), British rugby player
