= GME =

GME may refer to:

== Companies ==
- GameStop (stock ticker symbol GME), an American video game retailer
- General Microelectronics, a defunct American semiconductor manufacturer
- General Motors Egypt
- General Motors Europe
- Green Mountain Energy, American company
- Guardian Media Entertainment, collaboration between the National Hockey League and comics creator Stan Lee

== Education ==
- Gaelic medium education in Scotland
- Graduate medical education

== Other ==
- East Germanic languages
- FCA Global Medium Engine, an engine from Stellantis
- GME of Deutscher Wetterdienst, weather prediction model of the German Weather Service
- Generic Modeling Environment, software modelling tool
- Granulomatous meningoencephalitis, disease of the central nervous system of dogs and, rarely, cats
- Greater Middle East, a region
