= The Mutineers of the Bounty =

1879 short story by Jules Verne

"Mutineers of the Bounty"
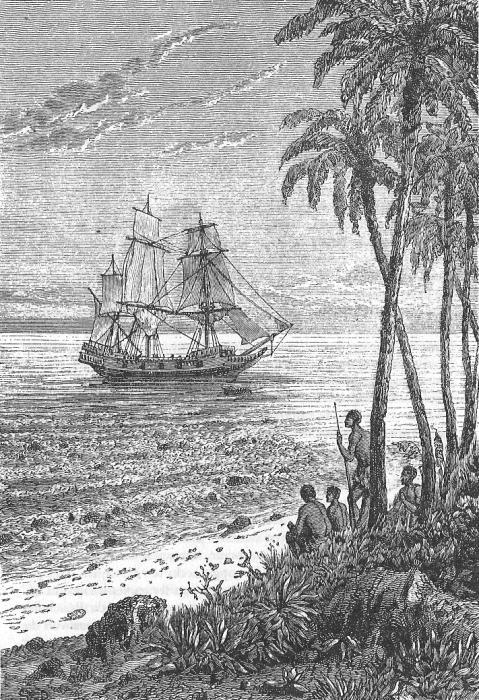
- An illustration from the first edition
- Author: Jules Verne
- Original title: Les Révoltés de la Bounty
- Translator: W. H. G. Kingston
- Illustrator: S. Drée
- Language: French
- Genre: Historical short story
- Publication date: 1879
- Publication place: France
- English publication date: 1879

Mutineers of the Bounty (French: Les Révoltés de la Bounty), translated in English by English writer W. H. G. Kingston, is a short story by Jules Verne. The story is based on British documents about the Mutiny on the Bounty and was published in 1879 together with the novel The Begum's Fortune (Les cinq cents millions de la Bégum), as a part of the series Les Voyages Extraordinaires (The Extraordinary Voyages).

Unlike many authors covering the topic, Verne concentrates on the deposed captain of the Bounty, William Bligh. After mutineers forced Bligh into the Bounty's 23-foot (7.0 m) launch on 28 April 1789, he led loyal crew members on a 6,710 kilometers (4,170 mi) journey to safety, reaching Timor 47 days later.

The original text was written by Gabriel Marcel (1843–1909), a geographer from the National Library of France. Jules Verne’s work was proofreading. Verne supposedly bought the rights to the text for 300 francs, but it had not been verified.
