= MeteoSwiss =

Swiss governmental agency

Federal Office of Meteorology and Climatology (MeteoSwiss)
- (in German) Bundesamt für Meteorologie und Klimatologie (in French) Office fédéral de météorologie et de climatologie (in Italian) Ufficio federale di meteorologia e climatologia (in Romansh) Uffizi federal per meteorologia e climatologia

Agency overview
- Jurisdiction: Federal administration of Switzerland
- Employees: 348
- Minister responsible: Élisabeth Baume-Schneider, Federal Councillor
- Parent agency: Federal Department of Home Affairs
- Website: www.meteosuisse.admin.ch

MeteoSwiss, (Note: German: MeteoSchweiz, French: MétéoSuisse, Italian: MeteoSvizzera) officially the Federal Office of Meteorology and Climatology, (Note: German: Bundesamt für Meteorologie und Klimatologie, French: Office fédéral de météorologie et de climatologie, Italian: Ufficio federale di meteorologia e climatologia, Italian: Uffizi federal per meteorologia e climatologia) is an office of the federal administration of Switzerland. It employs 290 people at locations in Zurich, Zurich Airport, Geneva, Locarno and Payerne.

== History ==
Originally established as the Central Meteorological Institute (MZA), by 1863 it operated 88 weather stations. Its name was changed in 1979 to Swiss Meteorological Institute (SMA). Since 1996, it has been operating as MeteoSwiss. Since 2006, its official name is "Federal Office of Meteorology and Climatology MeteoSwiss".

== Function ==
The office observes the weather around the clock, creating weather forecasts and alerting authorities and population, when strong winds, heavy rainfall, storms or heat waves are forecast. In addition, it provides weather services for the civil, military and private aviation.

The office also carries out a program of research and development to understand the weather and climate in the Alps. They also officially represent Switzerland at the World Meteorological Organization in Geneva.

== Full-time positions since 2007 ==
Raw data

Source: "Federal Finance Administration FFA: Data portal".

== See also ==
- Swiss Federal Institute for Forest, Snow and Landscape Research
- Swiss Seismological Service
- NinJo workstation used by MeteoSwiss
