= Henry Redhead Yorke =

English writer and radical publicist (1772–1813)

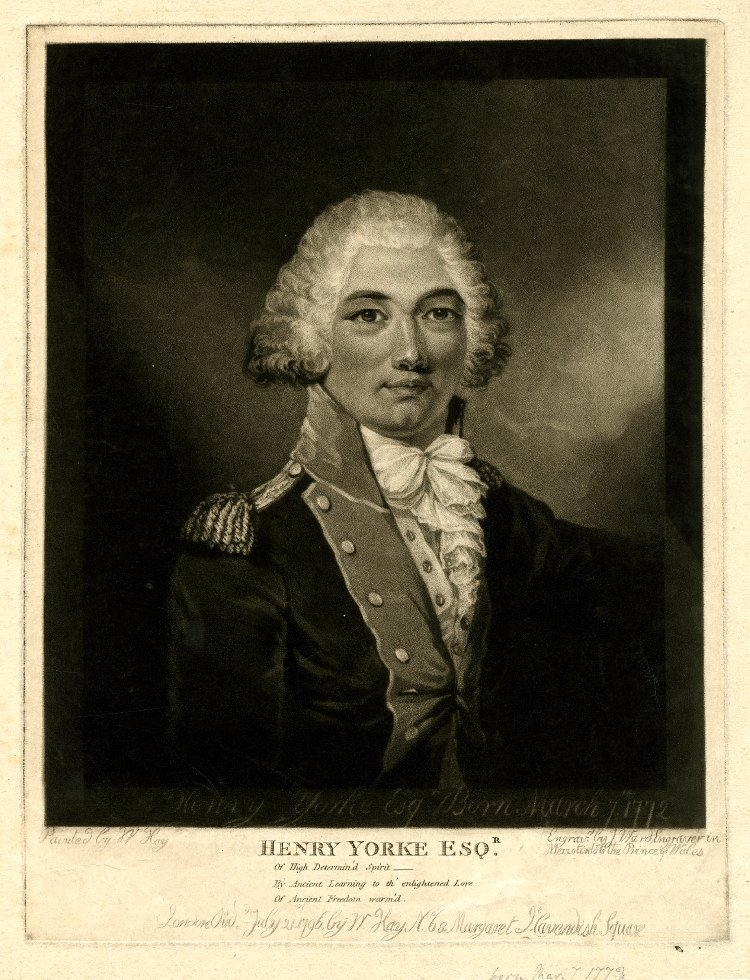
Henry Redhead Yorke

Henry Redhead Yorke, in early life Henry Redhead (1772– 28 January 1813) was an English writer and radical publicist.

== Early life and education ==
Henry Redhead was born in 1772 and brought up in Barbuda, in the eastern Caribbean, to a mother who was a freed slave from Barbuda and a father who was an Antiguan slave and plantation owner, an agent for the Codrington family, managing their slaveholding estates on the island. In 1771, Samuel Redhead (1704–1785) had purchased Sarah Bullock's (c.1745–1801) freedom from Sir William Codrington. Henry had three full siblings, Jane, Joseph and Sarah Ann who lived in a house built by their father in Barbuda. His father's much earlier marriage to Anne Crump (d. 1742) had produced five children.

Henry was taken to England by his father in 1778, and raised at Little Eaton, in Derbyshire. His mother and siblings followed the next year and the family lived in Bennet Street, Blackfriars until Samuel Redhead's death in 1785.

Henry and his brother Joseph inherited £1500 each, and a tenement in St John's, Antigua in their father's will, ensuring them a private income based on enslavement. In 1787 his mother Sarah Bullock remarried to a linen draper named Edward Henstock.

In 1788 Redhead began his university studies at Corpus Christi College, Cambridge. His brother Joseph joined him the following year. Redhead joined the Inner Temple in April 1790, but was not called to the bar until 29 November 1811 due to his political aspirations. Both brothers joined the Whig Club in 1790.

== Career ==
In Paris, France, in 1792, Redhead witnessed Louis XVI's appearance before the convention and was close to the Sheares brothers, and others of the so-called "British Club". He fell out with the British radicals over revolutionary politics, getting into disputes with John Oswald. He baulked at a clause in a proposed and defeated resolution of 11 January 1793, encouraging an English insurgency; and as a result was denounced by the economics writer Robert Rayment. Redhead was then the target of an arrest warrant made out by Jacques-Louis David, and left France. From this time, Redhead added Yorke to his name.

On his return to England, Yorke joined a radical society at Derby, which sent him in 1793 to Sheffield to assist another such society. On 7 April 1794 he addressed a large outdoor meeting at Sheffield, convened to petition for a pardon to Scottish radicals convicted in political trials and to promote the abolitionist cause. His description was circulated to the chief magistrates of Liverpool, Newcastle, Sunderland, Shields, Hull and Carlisle, leading to his arrest in Lincolnshire for the expression of revolutionary sentiments, through the collaboration of Richard Acklom Harrison, Collector of Customs in Hull and John Wray, Mayor of Barton, Lincolnshire.

At the York spring assize of 1795, true bills were found against him for conspiracy, sedition, and libel. On 23 July 1795, Yorke was tried at York before Sir Giles Rooke for conspiracy, in the absence of his co-defendants, including Joseph Gales, who had absconded. Yorke advocated parliamentary reform, but declared himself opposed to violence and anarchy. On 27 November 1795 he was sentenced by the King's Bench to two years' imprisonment in Dorchester Castle, fined, and required to give sureties of good behaviour for seven years.

Yorke was released in March 1798. His writings from then on showed support for the war policy of the Pitt administration, and he wrote on 3 August 1798 a private letter to William Wickham condemning the views of the Sheares brothers. He was a student of the Inner Temple from 1801, and revisited France in 1802. In 1806, he was near having a duel with Sir Francis Burdett, both parties being bound over to keep the peace.

== Works ==
In 1792, under his original name Redhead, he published a pamphlet against the abolition of slavery, but his opinions changed soon afterwards.

In a Letter to the Reformers (Dorchester, 1798), written in prison, Yorke justified the war with France. He wrote letters for twelve months in The Star under the signature of Alfred or Galgacus (these were reprinted in a short volume), and was part proprietor of the True Briton.

In 1801, and again in 1811, Yorke issued synopses of lectures in London on political and historical subjects. After a bout of illness, he was asked by Richard Valpy to undertake an expansion of John Campbell's Lives of British Admirals, but left the work incomplete.

Yorke also published:

- a letter to John Frost (1750–1842), entitled These are the Times that try Men's Souls, 1793;
- Reason Urged against Precedent, in a letter to the people of Derby, c.1793;
- a report on his trial, 1795;
- Thoughts on Civil Government, 1800;
- Annals of Political Economy, 1803;
- Letters from France, 1804;
- Mr Redhead Yorke's Political Review, 1805–11. Considered eccentric, the review admired Edmund Burke but was anti-Catholic.

== Personal life ==
Yorke married Jane Williams Andrews (1775–1857) on 26 November 1799 at St Martin-in-the-Fields, London. She was the daughter of George Andrews, keeper of Dorchester Castle and gaol, where Redhead York had been imprisoned. Her inheritances supported the family and her husband's work. The couple had four children, Blanche Elizabeth (1800–1811), Henry Galgacus (1802-1848), George Charilaus Camperdown (1805–1835), and Anne Jane (1810–1813). Henry Galgacus Redhead Yorke later became a Member of Parliament.

Henry Redhead Yorke suffered periods of serious illness, and died at Chelsea in London, on 28 January 1813.

== Notes ==
Attribution

This article incorporates text from a publication now in the public domain: Alger, John Goldworth (1900). "Yorke, Henry Redhead". In Lee, Sidney (ed.). Dictionary of National Biography. Vol. 63. London: Smith, Elder & Co. pp. 343–344.
