= James Ridgway =

Radical English publisher, member of the London Corresponding Society

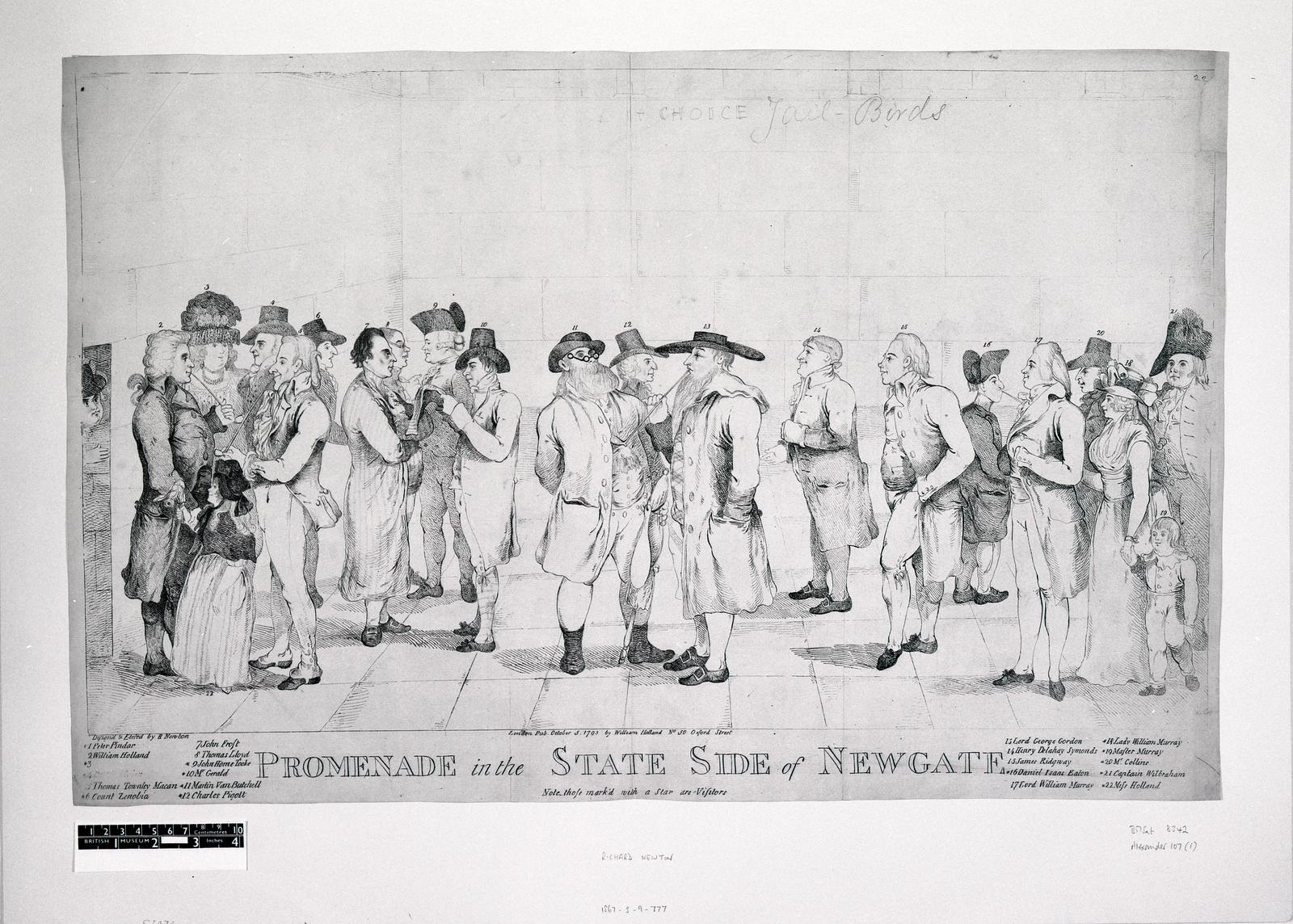
James Ridgway James Ridgway (cropped from file:Promenade in the State Side of Newgate (BM 1867,0309.777 1).jpg
- Born: James Ridgeway; 20 August 1755; Mottram-in-Longdendale, Cheshire, England
- Died: 6 May 1838 (aged 82)
- Occupations: Bookseller and Publisher
- Spouse(s): Caroline Carrington m. 11 November 1787 Lambeth, London, England, United Kingdom
- Children: Maria Ridgway (1789–1860), Caroline Ridgway (1790–1857), Charles James Ridgway (1792–1855), Joseph Carrington Ridgeway (1794–1874), James Leech Ridgeway (1799–1862)

James Ridgway (sometimes spelled ‘Ridgeway’, 1755 – 1838) was a publisher/bookseller, newspaper publisher and printseller in Piccadilly and York Street, St James's Square London, from around 1777 until his death in 1838. He published large numbers of political pamphlets, initially by Foxite Whigs but after 1791 by radical authors and by members of the London Corresponding Society. In 1793 he was charged with seditious libel and imprisoned in Newgate prison for four years for publishing the second half of Thomas Paine's 'The Rights of Man'. while in Newgate prison he was at the centre of publishing activities by radical booksellers and authors. Following his release in 1797 he continued publishing until his death in 1838, when he was succeeded by his son Charles James Ridgway (1792–1855).

== Life ==
Ridgway was born in Cheshire and baptised at Mottram in Longdendale, 20 August 1755, son of John Ridgway, Martha Ridgway. In 1780/1 he came to London to lodge with his sister and brother-in-law, the publisher John Stockdale and worked as a shopman on John Almon's newspaper, The London Courant. He married Caroline Carrington (1766-1832), at Lambeth 11 November 1787 and they had two daughters and three sons. He died 6 May 1838 and his obituary appeared in the Gentleman’s Magazine.

== Career ==
Ridgway's name is first recorded between December 1782 and March 1783 as 'publisher' on the imprint of Almon’s London Courant newspaper. By 1784 he had fallen out with Stockdale and set up in business on his own account, where he published an attack on his brother-in-law in his short-lived periodical The Intrepid Magazine. He was then living at No. 196 Piccadilly opposite Sackville Street, London and had become established as a significant publisher of political tracts. The business moved to 1 York Street, St James's Square, in 1790 where he published a defence of the Rhynwick Williams, the 'London Monster' by Theophilus Swift.

During the late 1780s and early 1790s Ridgway was a supporter of the Foxite Whigs, publishing many Whig authors. In 1793, together with Henry Delahay Symonds and George Westley, he was one of the three publishers to the Whig Society of the Friends of the People. However, dissatisfaction with Fox’s lack of progress towards parliamentary reform would later result in him leaving the Whig Party for the independent radical reform movements. In May 1794 Ridgway's bookshop was being described as ‘one of the key bookshops for the circulation of seditious materials’

Ridgway was also a printseller print and map publisher, employing, among others, James Gilray. There are many examples of his prints in both the National Portrait Gallery and the British Museum."James Ridgway". British Museum. 2024.

=== Extortion and blackmail ===
In early 1789 Ridgway had threatened to publish 500 libels publicising the invalid marriage between Maria Fitzherbert and George, Prince of Wales (later King George IV of the United Kingdom), and had been paid off by Richard Brinsely Sheridan. In 1790 and 1791 he was involved in two other extortionary publishing ventures, Topham's 'The Life of John Elwes', and Charles Stuart farce 'She would be duchess.' In November 1791 Ridgway was involved in an attempt to extort money from the opera singer Elizabeth Billington by threatening to publicise some correspondence containing evidence of indecent intercourse. Mrs Billington sued Ridgway 7 January 1792, but the Grand Jury threw out the case and declared Ridgway's conduct to have been highly candid, manly, and spirited.

=== Arrest and imprisonment ===
On 28 November 1792 the attorney general, Sir Archibald McDonald preferred bills of indictment against seven radical publishers and printers for libel. Ridgway, publisher to Friends of the People, was bailed but re—arrested 17 December. According to Manogue, Pitt inadvertently transformed from a radical but unknown bookseller-publisher into a hero of the radical cause and started him on his path to respectability and success.

Ridgway appeared before Justice Ashurst 8 May 1793 and pleaded guilty to publishing Charles Pigott's Jockey club and Paine's Letter Addressed to the Addressers. He was sentenced to a total of four years in Newgate and fined £200. Ridgway's arrest and imprisonment and the plight of the other radical booksellers gave rise to public sympathy, including a pamphlet signed "Justitia" criticising Ashurst entitled Justice to a Judge, (London, 1792 and 1793). Whilst imprisoned together between 1793 and 1797 Symonds and Ridgway joined their businesses issuing twenty-four different reform pamphlets for 'Society of the Friends of the People'. According to Manogue, quoting the Chancery suit of Southey v. Sherwood, 1817, Ridgway succeeded to Symonds' business after his death in 1816, but this probably only refers those copyrights shared by the two bookseller/publishers.

The imprisonment of Symonds, Ridgway and other 'Newgate radicals' was twice recorded by the engraver Richard Newton in 1793 in an etching titled “Promenade in the State Side of Newgate” (1793) and a coloured acquatint entitled 'Soulagement en prison'. Whilst in prison Ridgway and Symonds jointly published William Winterbotham's four volume, An historical, geographical, commercial, and philosophical view of the American United States, (1795) together with another imprisoned bookseller Daniel Holt. This included several engraved maps of the USA and portraits of George Washington. Winterbotham was also a prisoner in Newgate, and the author and his three publishers issued a halfpenny trade token showing Newgate prison and their names.

=== Release and subsequent career ===
After his release, Ridgway continued as a Piccadilly bookseller and publisher, publishing more than 5,000 further titles listed on the JISC Library Hub Discover between 1797 and 1838. He also acquired an Italian villa, and an estate for his children and grandchildren.'

Ridgway published The Botanical Register between 1815 and his death. Following the death of the editor, Sydenham Edwards in 1819, Ridgway also took over editorial duties and issued a further nine volumes between 1820 and 1828, before appointing John Lindley as editor.

The imprint Ridgway and sons begins to be used in 1826
