= List of attorneys and resident managers of Barbuda =

This is a list of attorneys and resident managers of Barbuda during the years that Barbuda was under the control of the Codrington family and operated as a slave estate (1738-1834).

This along with the * (asterisk), indicates that the attorney was also resident manager for the Island.

Attorney name	Manager name	Dates	Notes
Colonel Benjamin King		1740-1746	
	Thomas Beech	-1741	
	Simon Punter	1742-1743	
	McNish	-1745	Murdered in slave rebellion of December 1745
Martin and Byam		1746-1761	Held a lease from the Codrington family
Samuel Redhead*		1761-1779	In practice, Sarah Bullock wielded most authority
Richard Oliver		1779-1783	1779-1781 as assistant only
Richard Clarke		1779-1782	
Langford Lovell		1783-1792	
	Dennis Reynolds	1782-1793	
Joseph Walrond		1792-1797	
Samuel Byam Athill		1797-1805	
	William Collins	1793-1801	Dismissed
	William Huggins	1804	Interim
	John James	1804-1805	
John James*		1805-1826	Died 1826, not resident after 1822
Langford Lovell Hodge		1805-1816	
Samuel Martin		1809-1811	Was asked by Christopher Bethell Codrington to oversee the management of John James
John Osborn		1816-1828	
Robert Jarritt		1828-1830	
	John Winter	1827-1830	
John Winter*		1830-1836	
