= Charles Carpmael =

Canadian meteorologist

Charles Carpmael FRAS, FRSC
- Born: 19 September 1846; Streatham, UK
- Died: 21 October 1894 (aged 48); Hastings, UK
- Education: University of Cambridge
- Scientific career
- Fields: meteorology astronomy
- Workplaces: Dominion Meteorological Service

Charles Carpmael, FRAS, FRSC (19 September 1846 – 21 October 1894) was a British-Canadian meteorologist and astronomer. He was head of the Dominion Meteorological Service (now Meteorological Service of Canada) until 1894.

== Early life and education ==
Charles Carpmael was the son of Sarah Pitt and William Carpmael. He attended Clapham Grammar School and then the University of Cambridge.

== Career ==
He was recruited to the Dominion Meteorological Office by George Templeman Kingston in 1872. Carpmael became director of the observatory at Kingston's retirement in 1880. He sought to have the staff recognized as civil servants and engaged the office in international research efforts. He was a charter member of the Royal Society of Canada.

== Personal life ==
He married Julia McKenzie in 1876; they had two children. He died in Hastings in 1894 following a lengthy bout with what was believed to be stomach cancer.
