= William Wingfield (MP for Bodmin) =

William Wingfield KC, MP

Member of Parliament for Bodmin
- In office 1806–1807
- Preceded by: Josias Porcher
- Succeeded by: Sir William Oglander, 6th Baronet

Personal details
- Born: 1772 Mickleham, Surrey, England
- Died: 21 March 1858 (aged 85–86) Dorset, England
- Spouse(s): Lady Charlotte-Maria Digby; Elizabeth Mills
- Education: Christ Church, Oxford
- Profession: Judge

William Wingfield (later William Wingfield-Baker; 1772 – 21 March 1858) was an attorney, judge, and Member of Parliament in 19th century England.

== Early years ==
Born in Mickleham, Surrey, England, William was the second son of George Wingfield (died May 1774) of Mickleham. His mother, Mary, was the niece of George Sparrow.

William's brother, George Wingfield, Lord of Akeld, later took the surname Sparrow to comply with the will of a great uncle. The other siblings included three sisters:

- Anne (married Rev. Thomas Henry Hume, Canon of Salisbury, in 1793),
- Elizabeth (married John James in 1797),
- and Mary (married John Basset in 1790).

William's paternal grandfather, also named William Wingfield, owned property in Cleadon.

He entered Christ Church, Oxford, in 1789, and received a B.A. degree in 1792. He was admitted to Lincoln's Inn in 1792 and called to the bar at Lincoln's Inn five years later. His early practise was as an equity draftsman, in all likelihood because of the Inn's historical association with the Court of Chancery.

== Career ==
Wingfield served for a short time as a member of parliament for Bodmin during the period of 1806 to 1807 alongside Davies Gilbert. In 1818, he became a Bencher, and was appointed King's Counsel. Eight years later, he was a proprietor (one of 700) of the Russell Institution, a school of literature and science in Victorian London. Wingfield became Chief Justice of the Brecon Circuit. He was appointed Master in Chancery in 1824 upon the death of Sir John Simeon, 1st Baronet.

He held several positions within the Honorable Society of Lincoln's Inn including Master of the Walks in 1824, Keeper of the Black Book in 1825, Dean of the Chapel in 1827, and Treasurer in 1828.

He was a Trustee of the Law Fire Insurance Society.

== Personal life ==
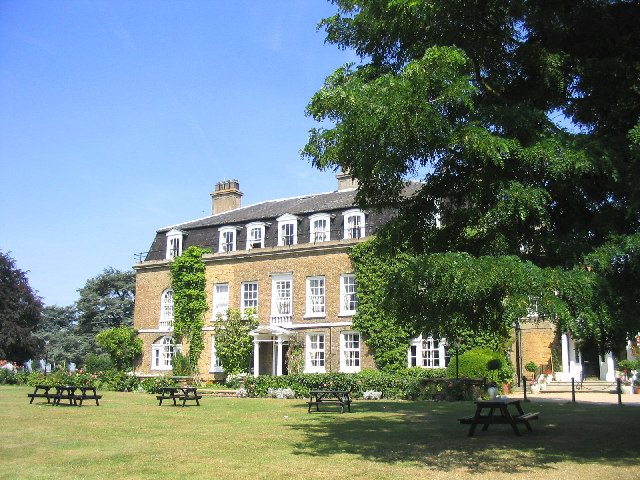
Orsett Hall

In 1796, he married Lady Charlotte-Maria (died 1807), eldest daughter of Henry Digby, 1st Earl Digby by whom he had several children, including:

- George Digby (who succeeded to the estates of the Earl Digby)
- John Digby
- Mary
- Caroline (who married Charles Pepys, 1st Earl of Cottenham),
- Frances Eliza
- Richard Baker Wingfield-Baker, an MP for South Essex

In 1813, he married Elizabeth, daughter of William Mills of Bitterne, Hampshire, a former East India Company director. They had several children, including:

- Charles John Wingfield Member of Parliament for Gravesend,
- William Wriothesley Digby (Vicar of Gulval)
- Frederick
- Henry
- Kenelm Digby
- Julia
- Lucy

He resided for a time at 29 Montague Street in London.

Wingfield legally changed his surname to Wingfield-Baker in 1849 by Royal licensure after his inheritance of Orsett Hall. The inheritance occurred by will when Richard Baker left his estate, Orsett Hall, to his brother's nephew by marriage to Lady St Aubyn (née Elizabeth Wingfield).

Wingfield died in 1858 at Sherborne Castle, the home of his eldest son, and is buried at Orsett. A window inscribed in his honour was erected by his children at Gulval Church.

Thomas Creevey described Wingfield as 'the most successful humbug simpleton I have known all my life'.
