= Niels Hoffmeyer =

Danish meteorologist (1836–1884)

- Niels Henrik Cordulus Hoffmeyer
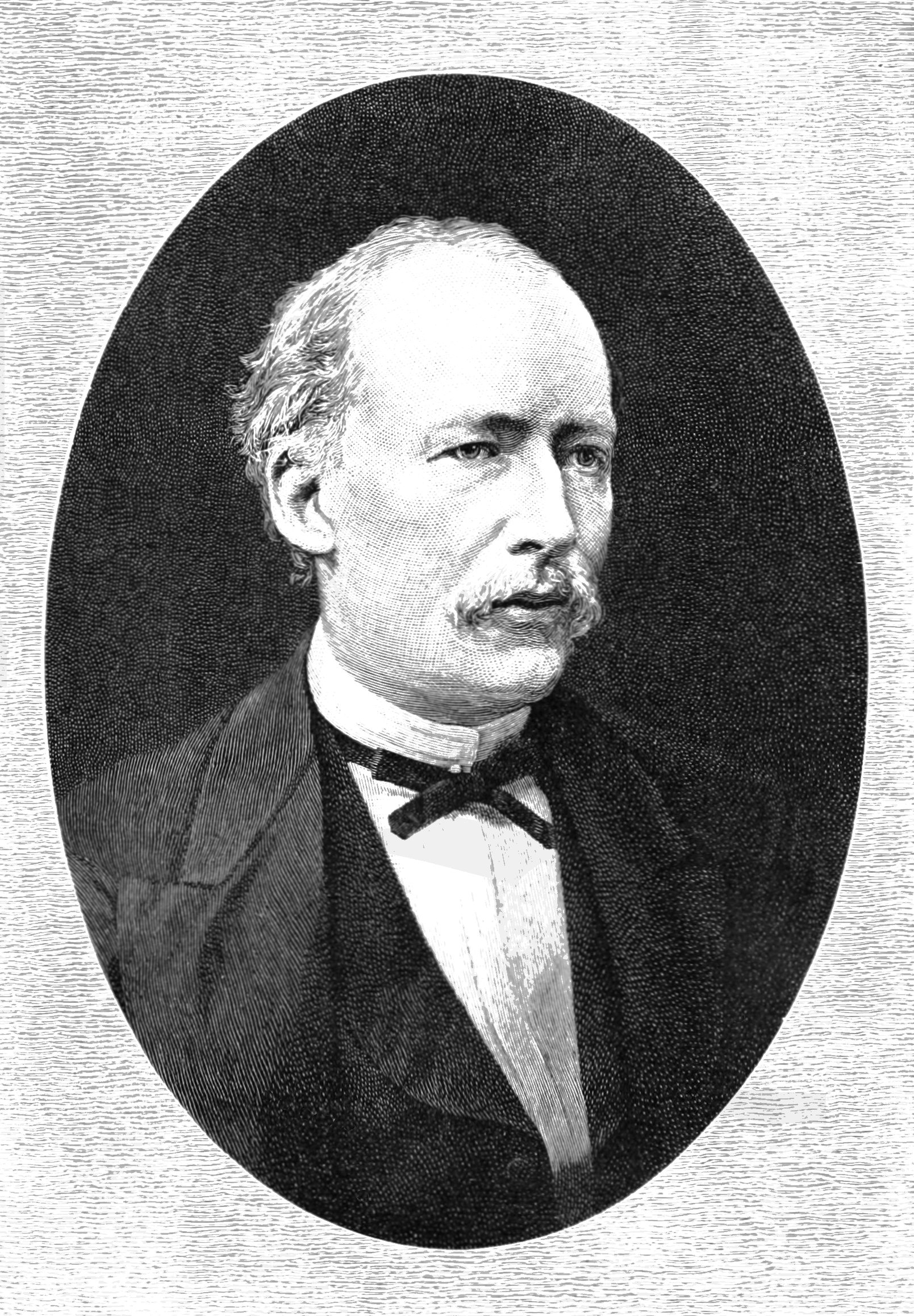
- Born: June 3, 1836; Copenhagen
- Died: February 16, 1884; Copenhagen
- Resting place: Assistens Cemetery
- Occupation: Meteorologist
- Father: Andreas Brock Hoffmeyer
- Relatives: Julius Hoffmeyer
- Awards: Knight of the Order of the Dannebrog (1878)

Niels Henrik Cordulus Hoffmeyer (3 June 1836 – 16 February 1884) was a Danish army officer who founded the Danish Meteorological Institute. He introduced synoptic weather maps into Denmark. They were known for sometime as Hoffmeyer maps.

Hoffmeyer was born in Copenhagen, the son of Colonel Andreas Brock Hoffmeyer. His brother was Julius Hoffmeyer. He went to school at the Land Cadet Academy and became a second lieutenant in 1853 and rose to the rank of captain in 1864 when he served in the Second Schleswig War. Being wounded he was sent to Paris where he studied French and became interested in meteorology. He noticed weather maps that had been introduced by Urbain Leverrier at the Paris observatory. He studied iron fabrication in Nantes and when he returned he worked at a foundry in Christiansholm. In 1868 he joined the war ministry and became in charge of artillery reinforcement. On 1 April 1872 the Danish Meteorological Institute was founded as part of the naval ministry. He was appointed the first director where he made use of his statistical skills. He organized a network of volunteers and observation stations and using information gathered through telegraphic networks, he began to produce graphical summaries of the weather. From 1873 he started the Meteorological Bulletin of the North. He produced isobar charts of the north Atlantic region. He also helped establish magnetic stations in the north pole as secretary to the Polar Commission. He helped organize the first International Meteorological Congress serving as a secretary for the meeting in Rome in 1876.

Hoffmeyer was made Knight of the Dannebrog in 1878. He suffered from rheumatic heart disease and died in 1884 and was buried in the Assistens Cemetery.
