= Sarah Bullock (slave) =

Unofficial leader of Barbuda

Sarah Bullock (c. 1745–1801), nicknamed Sally, was a once-enslaved mulatta woman from Barbuda. Bullock was in a romantic relationship with Samuel Redhead, the island's resident manager who later bought her freedom. Bullock was the de facto ruler of Barbuda, known to crack down fiercely on dissent and at most points exercising more authority than her partner. She was quite unpopular with the slaves on the island although no slave rebellions took place during her rule. During her tenure, there was an increase in crime: particularly sheep stealing which she and her family were known to participate in. Bullock had authority over all slaves and white employees on the island. In 1779 she and Redhead left Barbuda for England.

Bullock had four children with Redhead, who were all brought up in his Barbudan home: Jane, Joseph, Sarah Ann, and Henry. Her grandson (Henry's son) was elected to the British parliament for York in 1841.
