= Deutscher Wetterdienst =

National meteorological service of Germany

Coordinates: 50°06′11″N 8°44′52″E

German Weather Service
- Deutscher Wetterdienst
- Translation: German Weather Service "Weather and climate from a single source"

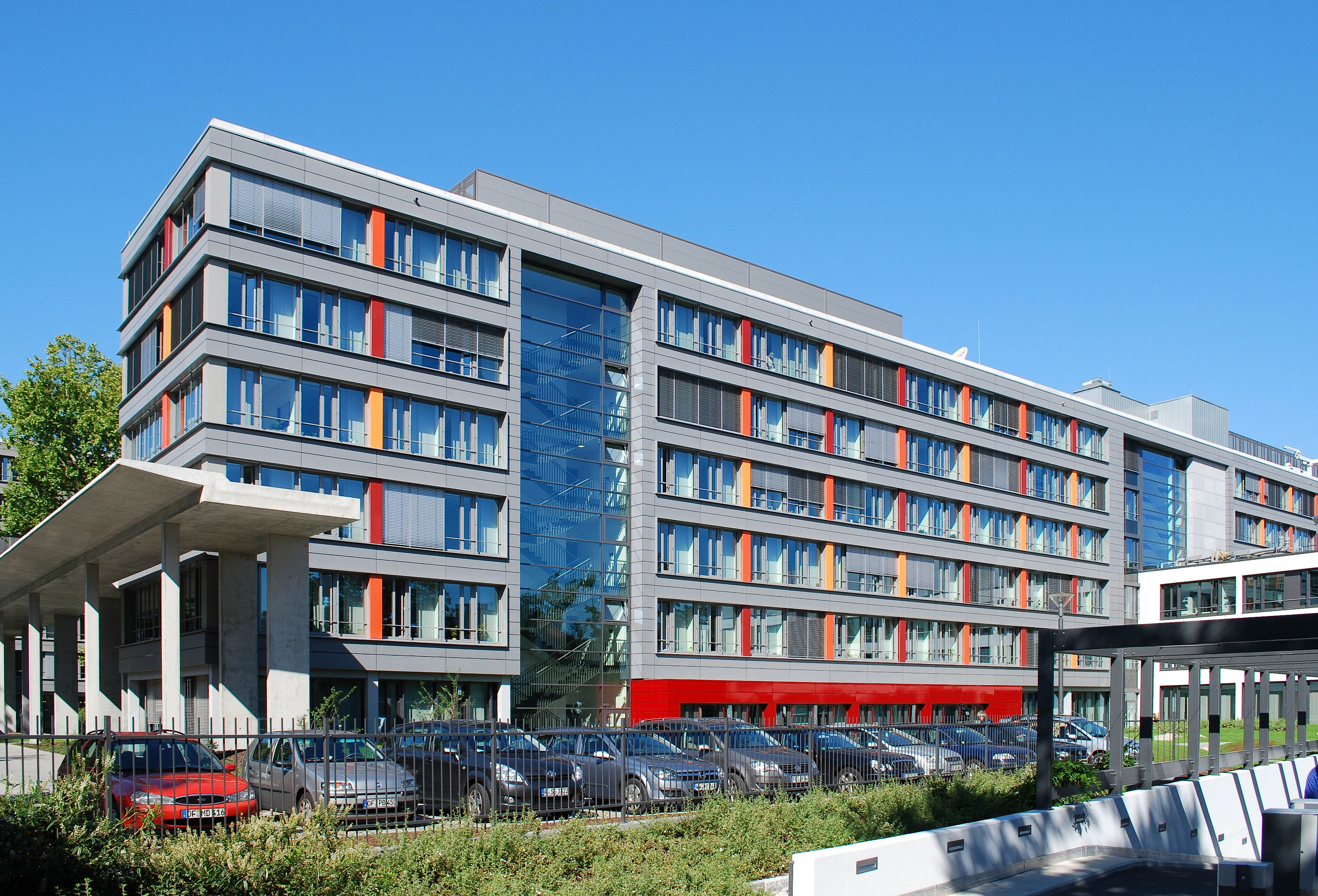
- Office in Offenbach

Agency overview
- Jurisdiction: Germany
- Employees: 2190 (31 December 2025)
- Website: www.dwd.de

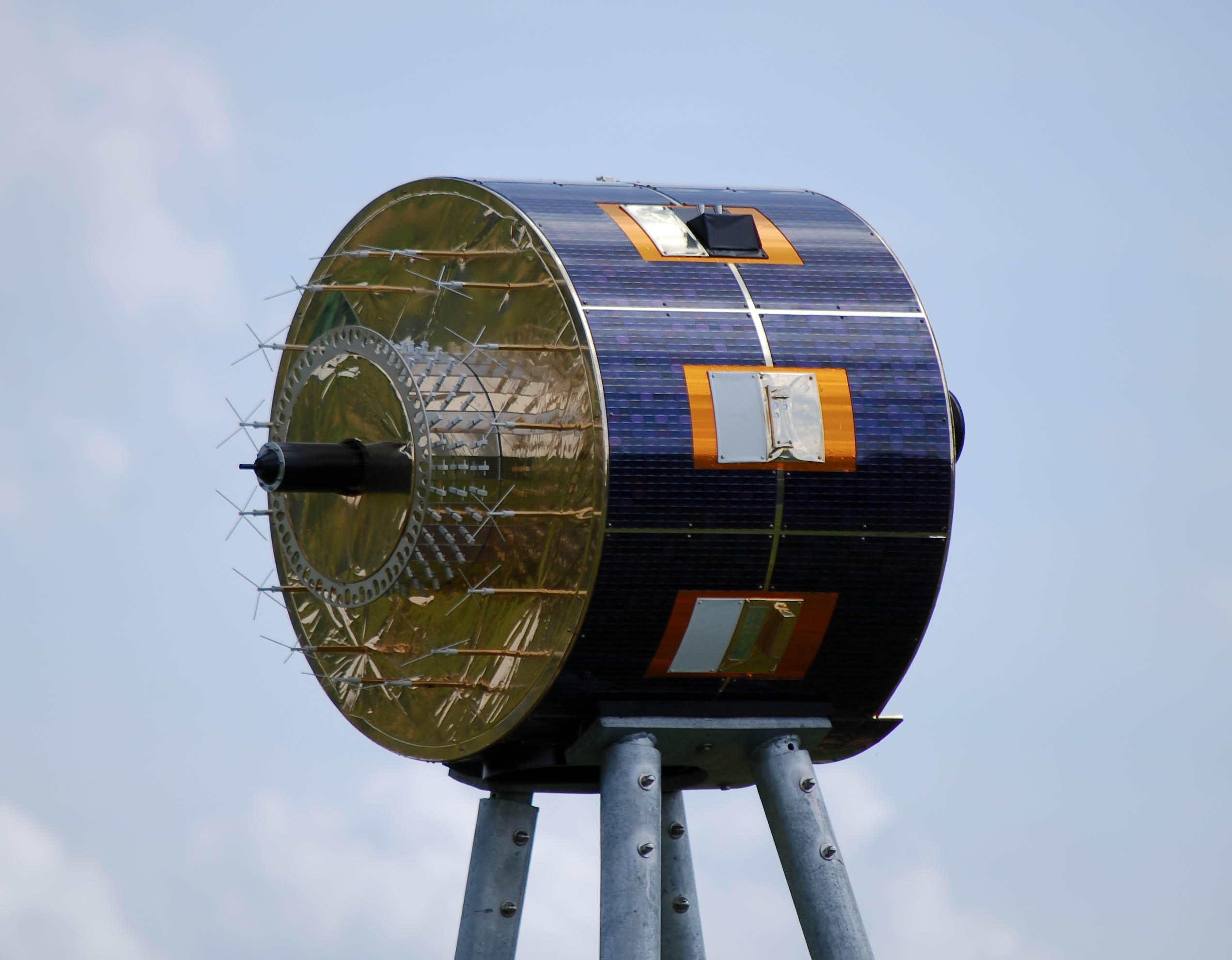
Model of the weather satellite Meteosat 9 in Offenbach, Germany

The Deutscher Wetterdienst (German pronunciation: [ˌdɔʏ̯ʧɐ ˈvɛtɐdiːnst]) or DWD, is the German Meteorological Service, based in Offenbach am Main, Hesse, which monitors weather and meteorological conditions over Germany. DWD provides weather services for the general public and for nautical, aviation, hydrometeorological or agricultural purposes. It is a state agency and under the legislation of the Federal Ministry for Transport. The budget for 2024 was 382 million euros.

The DWDs principal tasks include warning against weather-related dangers and monitoring and rating climate changes affecting Germany. The organisation runs atmospheric models on their supercomputer for precise weather forecasting. DWD manages the national climate archive and one of the largest libraries on weather and climate worldwide.

== History ==
The DWD was formed on 11 November 1952 when the weather services of the western occupation zones were merged. In 1954, the Federal Republic of Germany joined the World Meteorological Organization (WMO). In 1990, following the reunification, the weather services of the German Democratic Republic were incorporated in the DWD.

Since the 1990s, the DWD has continuously reduced the number of staffed weather stations, which entailed substantial staff cutbacks. The DWD does not expect a reduction in forecast quality, given techniques like weather radar or satellites, which have significantly improved weather data collection.

== Numerical weather prediction ==
The German Meteorological Service runs a global hydrostatic model... of its own, the GME (superseded by ICON in 2015), using a hexagonal icosahedral grid since 1 December 1999. They developed the High Resolution Regional Model (HRM) in 1999, which is widely run within the operational and research meteorological communities and run with hydrostatic assumptions. The German non-hydrostatic Lokal-Modell for Europe (LME) has been run since 2002, and an increase in areal domain became operational on 28 September 2005. Since March 2009, the DWD operates a NEC SX-9 with a peak performance of 109 teraFLOPS to help in the weather forecasting process.

DWD formerly ran two higher-resolution regional models based on the COSMO framework, COSMO-EU (covering Europe) and COSMO-DE (covering Germany and surrounding areas), maintained by the multinational COSMO consortium. Both have since been retired: COSMO-EU was replaced by the ICON-EU nest in December 2016, and COSMO-D2 (COSMO-DE's successor) was replaced by ICON-D2 in February 2021, ending DWD's operational use of COSMO-based models.

DWD's current numerical weather prediction system is built around ICON and its regional and ensemble configurations, including ICON-EU, ICON-D2, and the ICON-EPS ensemble; the ICON source code has been available under an open-source licence since January 2024.

== Public services ==
Since 2005, the DWD has been publishing regional warnings against heat with the aim to reduce heat related fatalities. This decision was made because of the hot summer in 2003, when estimated 7000 people died from direct or indirect effects of the heat. Additionally, it sends out sea weather reports as radioteletype and faxes. Since 2006, the pollen warnings can be subscribed to for free on the DWD web site. Within its duty of primary meteorological information, the DWD offers a free daily weather report for Germany, which can be subscribed to by email on their official website. DWD offers free access to its climate data.

In 2015, DWD began offering free-of-charge weather forecasts and weather warnings through its app WarnWetter, against which the commercial weather service WetterOnline sued based on the Law concerning the German Weather Service (Gesetz über den Deutschen Wetterdienst). In § 6, the law specifies that the DWD has to charge fees for providing weather services. Therefore, since 2017, DWD charges a one-time fee of 1.99 € to access weather forecasts in its app, and in 2020, the Federal Court of Justice confirmed that a free app offered by DWD – which is largely funded by the taxpayer – would illegally influence the weather forecasting market. Untouched by these legal ramifications, the free version of WarnWetter still warns about extreme weather conditions, and disasters.

== Structure and budget ==
=== Organisation ===
The Deutscher Wetterdienst is under the legislation of the Federal Ministry of Transport and based on the German Meteorological Office Act (Gesetz über den Deutschen Wetterdienst).

The Potsdam regional office of the German Weather Service in 2026

As of 31 December 2025, the DWD had roughly 2190 staff. DWD HQ is in Offenbach, Hesse. There are regional centres in Hamburg, Potsdam, Leipzig, Essen, Stuttgart, Freiburg, Warnemünde, and Munich. Additionally, it runs a dense network of meteorological measurement points with 183 full-time meteorological stations (60 of them staffed), as well as about 1784 extraordinal weather stations run by volunteers.

DWD hosts several international climate data centres, among them for example:

- The Global Precipitation Climatology Centre (GPCC): GPCC is operated by DWD under the auspices of the World Meteorological Organization. GPCC provides precipitation analyses for the global land area. For that purpose, station-based precipitation observations are obtained from different sources, primarily from national meteorological services.
- The Satellite Application Facility on Climate Monitoring (CM SAF): CM SAF develops and distributes satellite-derived products of the energy and water cycle. It is part of the distributed EUMETSAT Application Ground Segment and is organized as a network of European partners, with DWD as the leading entity.
- The Monitoring Centre (GSNMC) of the GCOS Surface Network (Global Climate Observing System)

=== Budget ===
DWD had a budget of 382 million euros in 2024, of which about 148 million euros were transferred to international organisations like EUMETSAT and others. DWD's planned budget for 2026 is 387 million euros, of which about 142 million euros is allocated to international organisations.

== See also ==
- ICON – Germany's global weather forecasting system

=== Related article ===
- NinJo workstation used by DWD

=== External links ===
- Official website
- DWD on Top500.org
