= NinJo =

- NinJo 1.7, released in 2013.
- Developer(s): Deutscher Wetterdienst; Bundeswehr; Danmarks Meteorologiske Institut; MeteoSwiss; Meteorological Service of Canada
- Initial release: 2000; 25 years ago
- Written in: Java
- Operating system: Linux, MS Windows
- Available in: Danish, English, French, German
- Website: www.ninjo-workstation.com

NinJo is a meteorological software system. It is a community project of the German Weather Service, the Meteorological Service of Canada, the Danish Meteorological Institute, MeteoSwiss, and the German Bundeswehr. It consists of modules for monitoring weather events, editing point forecasts and viewing meteorological data. An additional batch component is able to render graphical products off-line, these may, for example, be visualized by a web service. Essentially it is a client—server system an implemented fully with the programming language Java.

NinJo was initiated by the German Weather Service (Deutscher Wetterdienst, DWD) and the German army (Bundeswehr Geo Information Service, BGIS) in 2000. Since 2006, NinJo has been used operationally. NinJo is licensed for weather services, organisations and universities not taking part in the development consortium.

== Description ==
NinJo is a client-server system with interactive displays on the client side fed by batch applications implemented on the server. The system is programmed entirely in Java and can easily be extended by further layers and applications according to user-specific requirements. The workstation fed by the servers can be installed on different operating systems (e.g. Unix, Linux and Microsoft Windows), avoiding importing the source code onto the specific operating system.

The NinJo Server imports a variety of meteorological data, such as METAR reports, weather radar and weather satellite images and numerical weather prediction (NWP) outputs, through dedicated file handling programs, and make them accessible to the client displays.

The client is a NinJo workstation which presents data in separate layers. Users can add as many layers to a NinJo scene as they want with all layers show time-synchronised data for the same map area. The layers show geo-referenced data, not fix images, so the screen display is always done directly from the data and interactive probing using the mouse is giving the values of the original data, not a scale extracted one. The data are stored in native format, rather than stored in a common internal format, avoiding degradation in zooms and always keeping the full details and resolution of the original data.

The layers are independent, can be added and removed from the scenes separately, and be set visible or invisible. Layers can be arranged in any order the users want enabling them to arrange all data types according to their specific needs. Scenes can be set for:

- Visualisation of weather products
- Monitoring the state of data input
- Production of weather warnings
- Interactive editing of texts
- Configuration of NinJo batch products

Different tools are available for enhancing or interrogating the displays. For example, it is possible to do vertical cross-sections in a layered scene, extracting the vertical structure of NWP or radars data.
