= Henry Delahay Symonds =

Radical English publisher, member of the London Corresponding Society

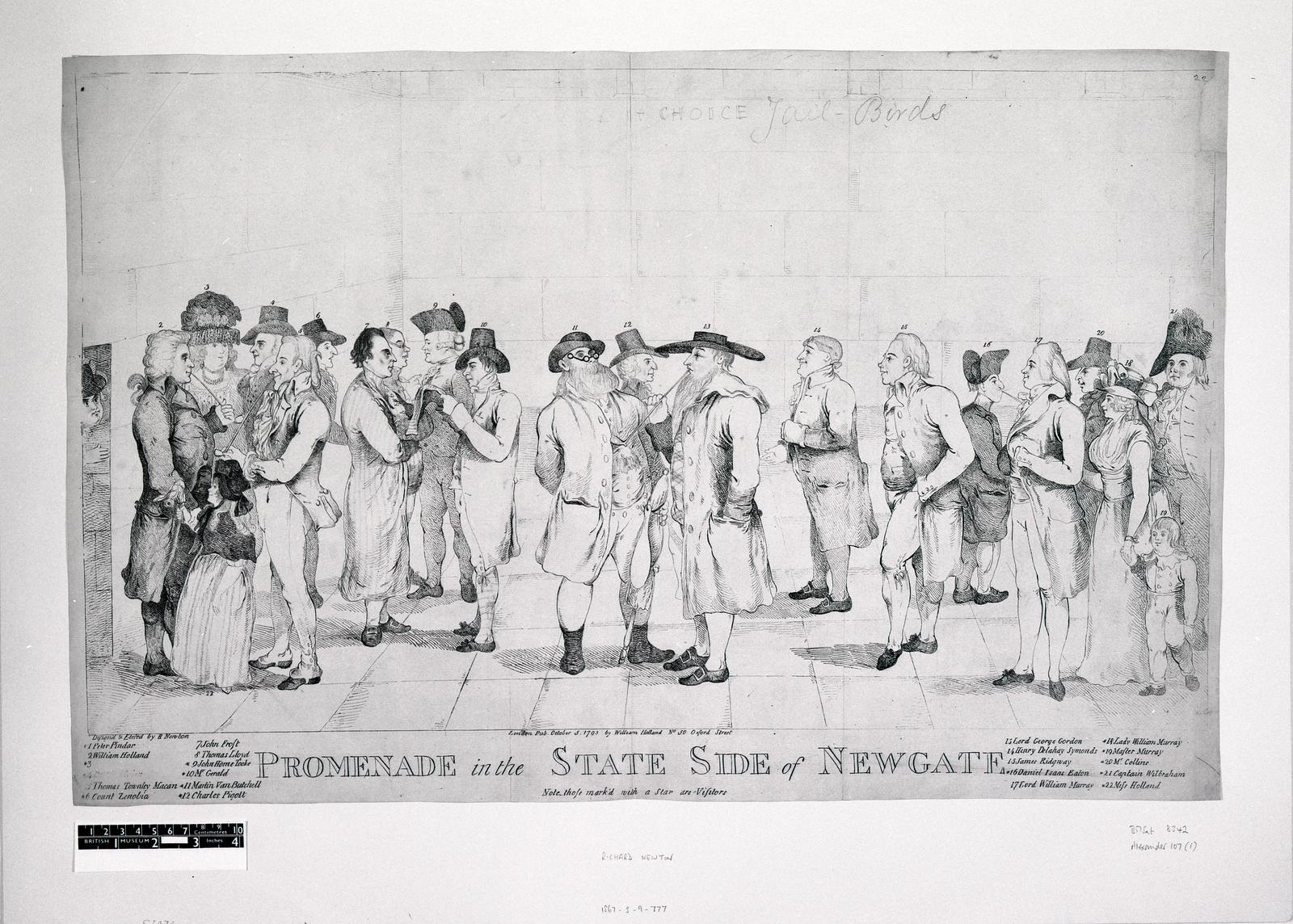
Henry Delahay Symonds Henry Delahay Symonds (cropped from file:Promenade in the State Side of Newgate (BM 1867,0309.777 1).jpg
- Born: Henry Delahay Symonds; 1740 or 1741; London, England
- Died: 4 May 1816
- Occupations: Bookseller and Publisher
- Spouse: Jane Glover married 5 October 1783
- Children: Jane Symonds b. 5 September 1784; Henry Delahay Symonds and Richard Delahay Symonds, b. 22 August 1787, Ann Symonds b. 26 February 1792; Liberty Henry Symonds b.11 September 1793

Henry Delahay Symonds (also sometimes spelled ‘Delahoy’, ‘Delahaye’, or 'de la hay', 1740–1816) was a London publisher/bookseller and printseller. He published many works by radical authors and by members of the London Corresponding Society, during the 1790s. In 1791 Symonds was charged with seditious libel and imprisoned in Newgate prison for publishing the second half of Thomas Paine's Rights of Man, becoming one of the 'Newgate radicals'. Following his release in 1796 he continued publishing until c. 1808.

== Life ==
Few details are known of Symonds’ origins. His age at death was variously given as 75 or 76 years, giving a probable date of birth in 1740 or 1741. He had been living in the parish of St Martin Ludgate and had married Jane Glover of St Michael Cornhill, London, 5 October 1783. He was buried on 4 May 1816 in St Mary's church Beddington, Surrey,

According to Manogue, James Ridgway succeeded to Symonds' business after his death in 1816, but this may refer to some of his copyrights. According to his will he bequeathed £500 to his daughter Jane Neely, the wife of Samuel Dunbar Neely, bookseller and the residue of his estate to his daughter Ann Symonds. His obituary stated that he died at Islington and for many years he was 'an active and considerable bookseller in Paternoster-row; having a few years since retired in favour of Messrs. Sherwood, Neely and Jones.

== Career ==
Symonds became a freeman of the Company of Stationers on 2 December 1783, by redemption. The name H.D. Symonds is found as either publisher or joint publisher on more than 1,200 imprints of books, maps and engravings, the earliest of which describes him as ‘successor to the late Mr. Thomas Caslon’ at no. 4, Stationers-Court, Ludgate-Street. After 1787 he resided at 20 & 21 Paternoster Row.

During the early 1790s Symonds became active in the movement for parliamentary reform, as a member of the London Corresponding Society (LCS), the 'Society for Freedom of the Press', the Society for Constitutional Information and the Society of the Friends of the People. He was a member of the LCS committee that decided to have twelve thousand copies of Thomas Paine's Letter Addressed to the Addressers printed and circulated.

== Imprisonment ==
In 1791 he was charged with seditious libel and imprisoned for two years in Newgate prison for publishing the second half of Paine's Rights of Man. On 8 May 1793 he was also convicted, together with the publisher James Ridgway, for publishing Charles Pigott's anonymous satire The Jockey Club and Thomas Paine's Address to the Addressers. Symonds was sentenced to a total of four years and fined £200. In an attempt at reducing his sentence, Symonds had previously written to the Attorney-General on 22 February 1793, 'the extensiveness and nature of my business... in which I circulate more books than any man in England, has pointed me out to designing men as their dupe... I am no politician – I know the contents of books put into my hands for sale, or with my name to them – by these means I have been imposed upon by men deserving of prosecution...'. Symonds was identified by the government as "Master mover in all libelous matters". Whilst imprisoned together between 1793 and 1797 Symonds and Ridgway joined their businesses issuing twenty-four different reform pamphlets for 'Society of the Friends of the People'.

The imprisonment of Symonds, Ridgway and other 'Newgate radicals' was twice recorded by the engraver Richard Newton in 1793 in an etching titled “Promenade in the State Side of Newgate” (1793) and a coloured acquatint entitled 'Soulagement en prison'. Whilst in prison Symonds jointly published William Winterbotham's four volume, An historical, geographical, commercial, and philosophical view of the American United States, (1795) together with imprisoned booksellers John Ridgway and Daniel Holt. This included several engraved maps of the US and portraits of George Washington. Winterbotham was also a prisoner in Newgate, and the author and his three publishers issued a halfpenny trade token showing Newgate prison and their names.

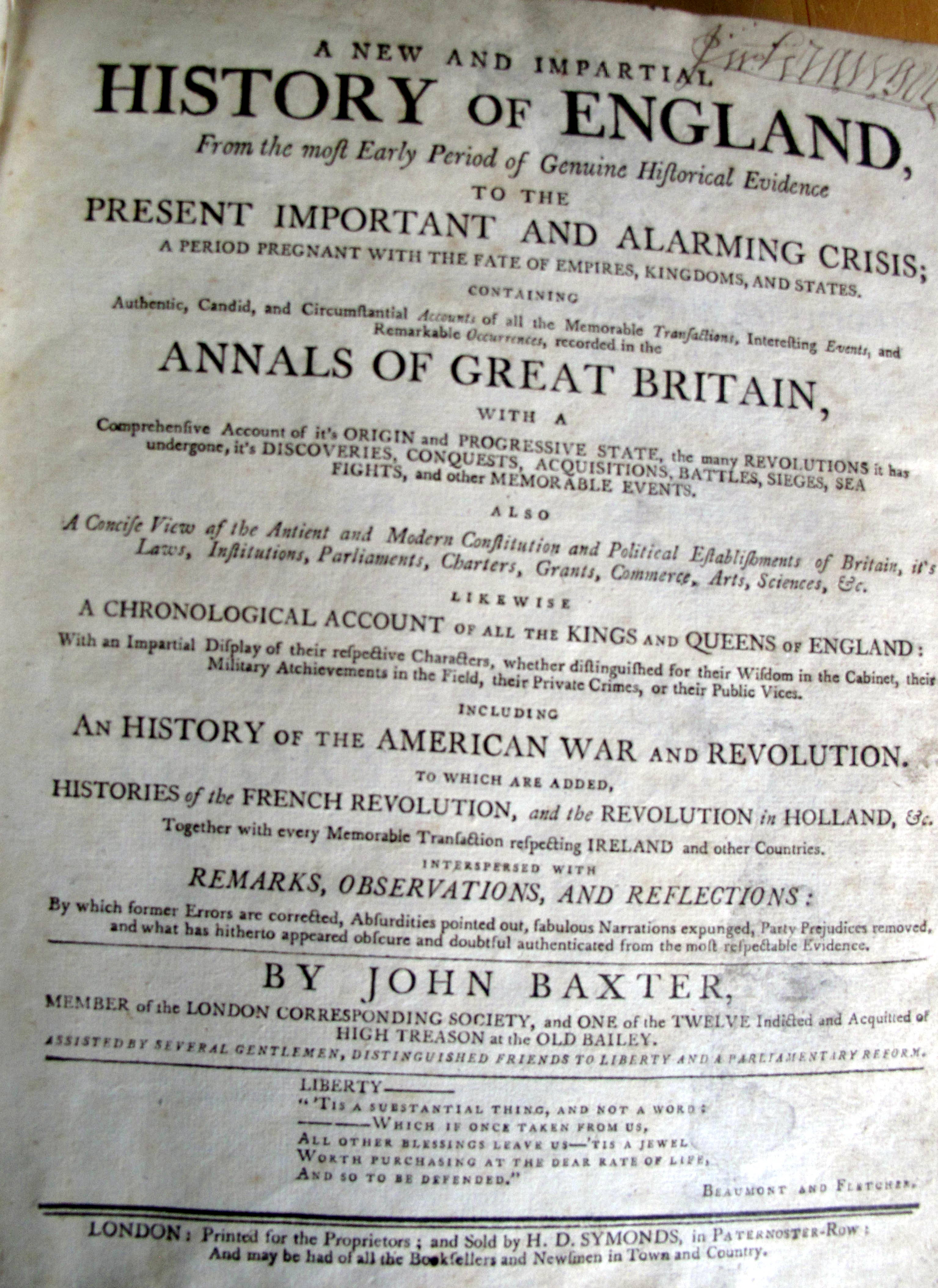
Title page of Baxter's History of England, 1796

== Release ==
Following his release from Newgate in 1796, Symonds continued publishing and in 1799 issued a 13-page catalogue of New books printed for H. D. Symonds, No. 20, Paternoster-Row. 1799. Other noteworthy publications included the second edition of Sampson Perry, An historical sketch of the French Revolution commencing with its predisposing causes, and John Baxter's 830 page A new and impartial history of England, which included engraved portraits of several of the radicals.

A reference dated 15 April 1806, when Symonds joined 'The friends of literature' described him as a retired bookseller, although his name continued to appear on new imprints until 1808.

According to Iain McCalman: 'Symonds remains one of the most neglected of radical publishers of the 1790s'
