= John James (Manager of Barbuda) =

Resident Manager of Barbuda
- In office 5 June 1805 – 31 July 1826
- Preceded by: William Huggins (interim)
- Succeeded by: John Winter

Personal details
- Born: 16 February 1774 Marazion, Cornwall, England
- Died: 31 July 1826 (aged 52) St. John's, Saint John, Antigua
- Spouse: Elizabeth Wingfield
- Children: Elizabeth Prideaux James; John Wingfield James; Mary James
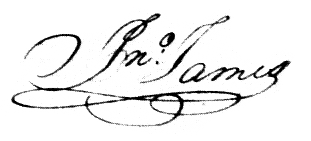
- Signature

John James (16 February 1772 – 31 July 1826), was an attorney and resident manager of the Caribbean estate of Christopher Bethell Codrington, on the Island of Barbuda 1805-1826.

== Early years ==
Born in Marazion, Cornwall, England, John was the son of Captain John James (1725 - 1803) of St Michael's Mount, Cornwall, a liquor merchant and sometime privateer Captain. His mother, Elizabeth Millett, was the daughter of a prominent local merchant.

== Personal life ==
On 6 February 1797 John James was married to Elizabeth Wingfield at St Hilary, Cornwall. Elizabeth came from a prominent family, her brother was William Wingfield a Judge and Member of Parliament. She was also a cousin of Sir John St Aubyn, 5th Baronet. John and Elizabeth had three children together including:

- Elizabeth Prideaux James (b.1798)
- John Wingfield James (b.1800)
- Mary James (b.1801)

== Career at Barbuda ==
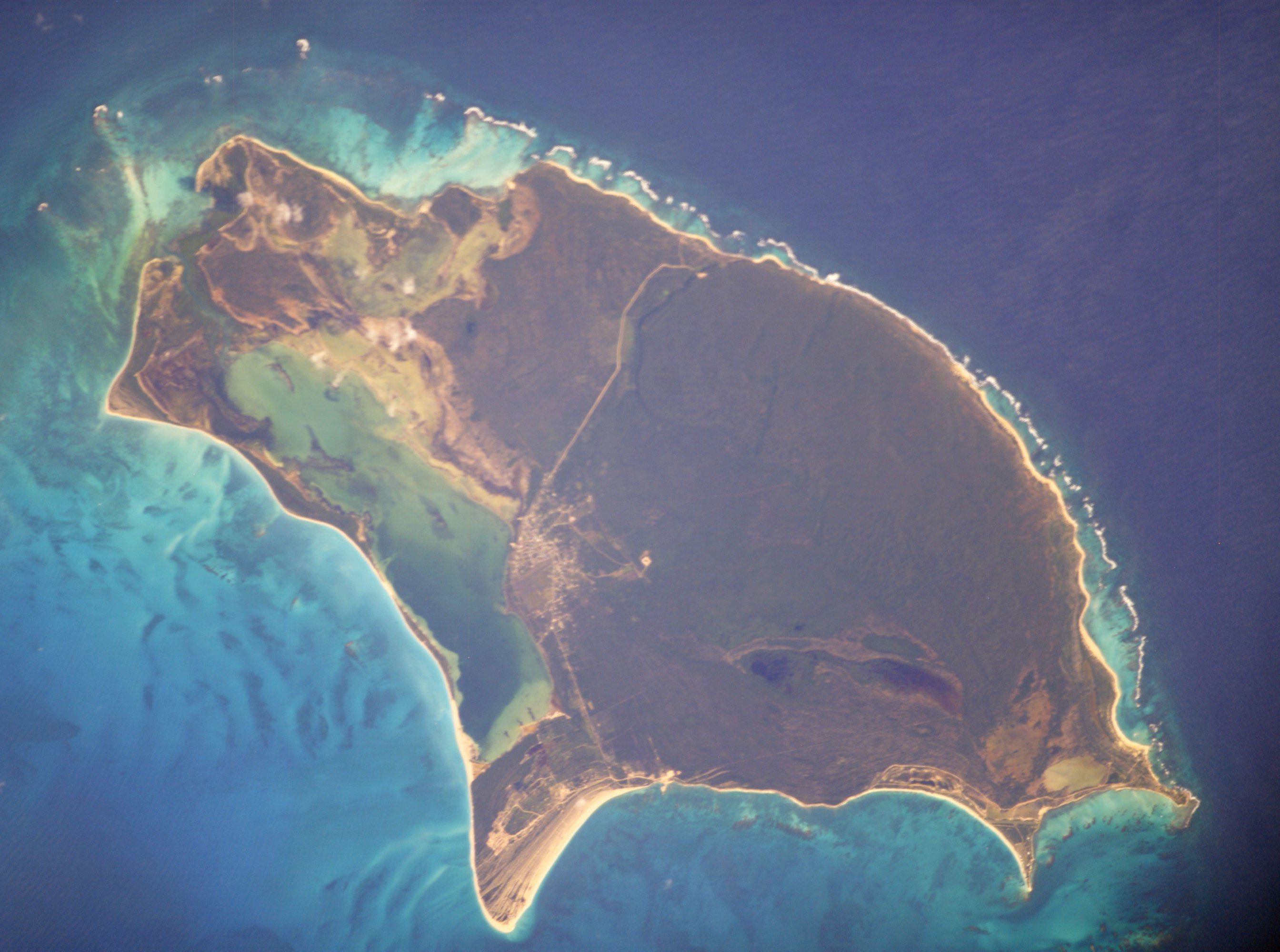
Barbuda

John James left England on 20 May 1804 and arrived in Antigua on 5 July, but was unable to get to Barbuda until 21 July 1804. He was appointed by Christopher Bethell Codrington to the position of Attorney for Barbuda in a letter to his superior, Samuel Byam Athill, dated 5 June 1805. Barbuda, at the time of John James’ arrival, consisted of 314 slaves about 500 head of cattle and 20,000 – 25,000 sheep.

== Death ==
John James died on 31 July 1826, at the age of 52, in St John's Antigua. His death was reported to his employer, but no hint is given as to its cause. There are several references to regularly returning, debilitating fever in his letters to Christopher Bethell Codrington, so it is likely that he suffered from malaria. Yellow fever was also prevalent in the Caribbean at this time.
