= Danish Meteorological Institute =

Danish national weather forecasting service

- Danmarks Meteorologiske Institut
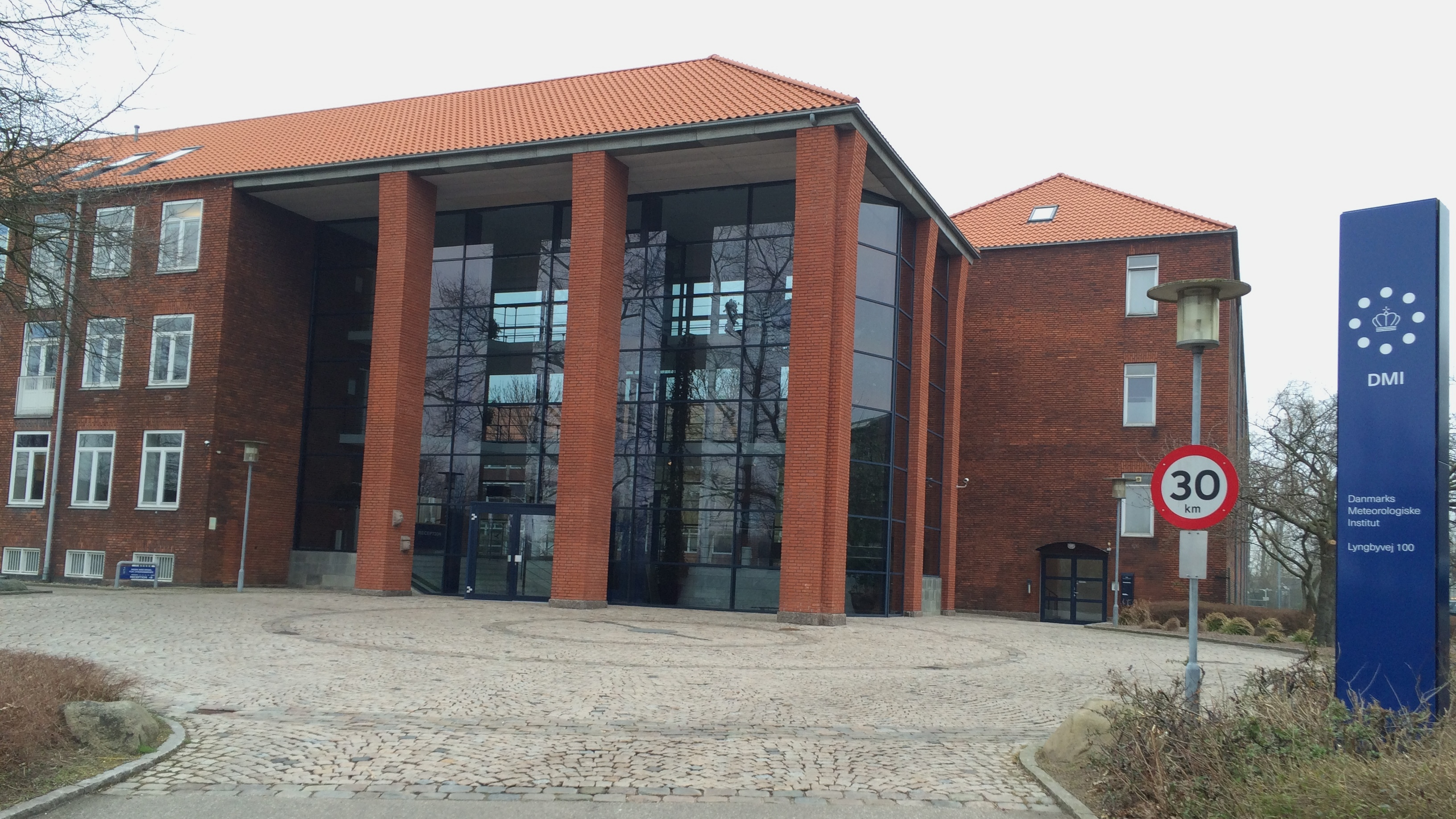
- Headquarters of the DMI, Copenhagen.

Weather monitoring and forecasting agency overview
- Formed: 1872
- Preceding agencies: Meteorological Institute; Meteorological Service for Civil Aviation; Meteorological Service for Defence
- Jurisdiction: Ministry of Energy, Utilities and Climate
- Headquarters: Copenhagen; 55.715390°N 12.560998°E
- Motto: Vi klæder dig på til fremtidens vejr.
- Employees: 380-400
- Annual budget: 285 million DKK (2020)
- Website: www.dmi.dk

The Danish Meteorological Institute (DMI; Danish: Danmarks Meteorologiske Institut) is the official Danish meteorological institute, administrated by the Ministry of Climate, Energy and Utilities. It makes weather forecasts and observations for Denmark, Greenland, and the Faroe Islands.

== History ==
The Danish Meteorological Institute (DMI) was founded in 1872, primarily through the efforts of Ludwig A. Colding. DMI integrates the expertise of three predecessor organizations: the former Meteorological Institute, the Meteorological Service for Civil Aviation, and the Meteorological Service for Defence.

- The Meteorological Institute was established in 1872 under the Ministry of the Navy.
- The Meteorological Service for Civil Aviation began operations in 1926 as part of the Civil Aviation Administration.
- The Meteorological Service for Defence was created in 1953.

The current DMI was formed in 1990 through the merger of these three institutions. It operates under the Ministry of Transport and employs approximately 380 staff members, in addition to around 450 voluntary weather and climate observers.

The institute was originally established to "make observations, communicate them to the general public, and develop scientific meteorology." These objectives remain central to DMI's mission, despite significant advancements in communication technology and an increased demand for qualified meteorological advice. Today, DMI is recognized for its comprehensive and internationally acclaimed expertise in all aspects of weather and climate.

DMI is responsible for meeting the meteorological needs of society across the Kingdom of Denmark, which includes Denmark, the Faroe Islands, and Greenland, as well as their territorial waters and airspace. This responsibility involves monitoring atmospheric, terrestrial, and marine weather, climate, and environmental conditions. The primary goals of these activities are to protect human life and property while providing a basis for economic and environmental planning—particularly in sectors such as the armed forces, aviation, shipping, and road traffic.

While DMI is well-known for its media weather forecasts, it also plays a vital role in assisting businesses, institutions, and the public in making informed decisions related to economic, environmental, and safety considerations. Its services are extensively used by the fisheries and agricultural sectors, as well as by sports associations and other organizations.

DMI's capabilities and services are supported by advanced technologies, including supercomputers, satellites, radar systems, and automatic measuring equipment. Ongoing research and development ensure that DMI operates efficiently and effectively, meeting modern quality standards for its products and services.

== Weather Models ==
In 1985, the Danish Meteorological Institute (DMI) collaborated with national weather services from the Nordic countries, as well as those from the Netherlands, Ireland, and Spain, to establish a research partnership focused on the High Resolution Limited Area Model (HIRLAM) for weather forecasting. This cross-country research initiative marked the first collaboration of its kind in the world, leading to the successful operational implementation of a state-of-the-art short-range regional weather forecast model in Denmark and other member countries of HIRLAM.

Since 2004, HIRLAM has expanded its research efforts through a partnership with the ALADIN consortium, led by Météo-France. This collaboration aims to advance the mesoscale, non-hydrostatic forecasting system known as AROME. As a result of this joint effort, the HIRLAM consortium developed the new generation cloud-resolving numerical weather prediction (NWP) system called Harmonie-AROME. This system focuses on operational applications of kilometer-scale ensemble forecasting, specifically designed to predict and issue warnings for high-impact weather events such as flash flooding, thunderstorms, heavy summer rain, gusty winds, and winter snowstorms.

At DMI, the Harmonie-based kilometer-scale forecasting system has been progressively operationalized since 2013 for routine forecasts covering Greenland, the Faroe Islands, and Denmark. In 2017, DMI introduced an innovative ensemble forecasting system called COMEPS (COntinuous Mesoscale Ensemble Prediction System). This 25-member system operates at a resolution of 2.5 kilometers and employs hourly data assimilation with an overlapping observation window, allowing for an hourly refresh of probabilistic forecasts.

In 2018, DMI operationalized the first hectometric-scale NWP system, specifically designed for predicting strong coastal winds in southern Greenland.

Additionally, DMI operates an ice patrol service based in Narsarsuaq, southern Greenland. This service monitors sea ice and icebergs along Greenland's coasts, creates ice charts, and addresses other safety-related tasks crucial for navigation in Greenlandic marine waters.

== Equipment ==
=== Computer ===
In 1984, DMI acquired a Sperry 1100 from University of Copenhagen, and upgraded it with vector processors in 1985. It was replaced with a Convex 3880 in 1992. A NEC SX 4 was used from 1996, and a NEC SX-6 from 2002. A dual Cray XT5 marked the switch from vector to scalar in 2007. From 2016, the Icelandic Meteorological Office (Veðurstofa) manages a 192 teraFLOPS dual Cray XC30 system for DMI as weather forecast, due to cheaper electricity and cooling. One is used for development, the other for daily operations. Data traffic between Iceland and Denmark uses two 10 Gbit/s cables (Danice/FARICE-1). The XC30s are scheduled to be upgraded to 700 Tflops in 2018.

=== Radar ===
DMI operates five dual-polarization C-band weather radars from Finnish-based Vaisala. These radars have a Doppler and full-range of 240 km. DMI's first precipitation radar was installed in Karup in 1957, but due to its limited technological capabilities, it was decommissioned in the early 1990s. Starting in 1992, DMI began upgrading its radar network with single-polarization radars, and by 2017-2023, these radars underwent further modernization to dual-polarization. During this process, the Sindal (1994) radar was replaced with a newer Vaisala dual-polarization radar, and the Virring (2008) radar was gradually phased out in favor of a new radar on Samsø, also made by Vaisala. In late October 2024, DMI began upgrading their radar's Doppler range from 120 km to 240 km, and by Spring 2025, DMI plans to further expand on the output products produced by the five radars, aiming to enhance detection of cloudbursts, thunderstorms, hailstorms and eventually tornadoes.

=== Meteorological and hydrological observation stations ===
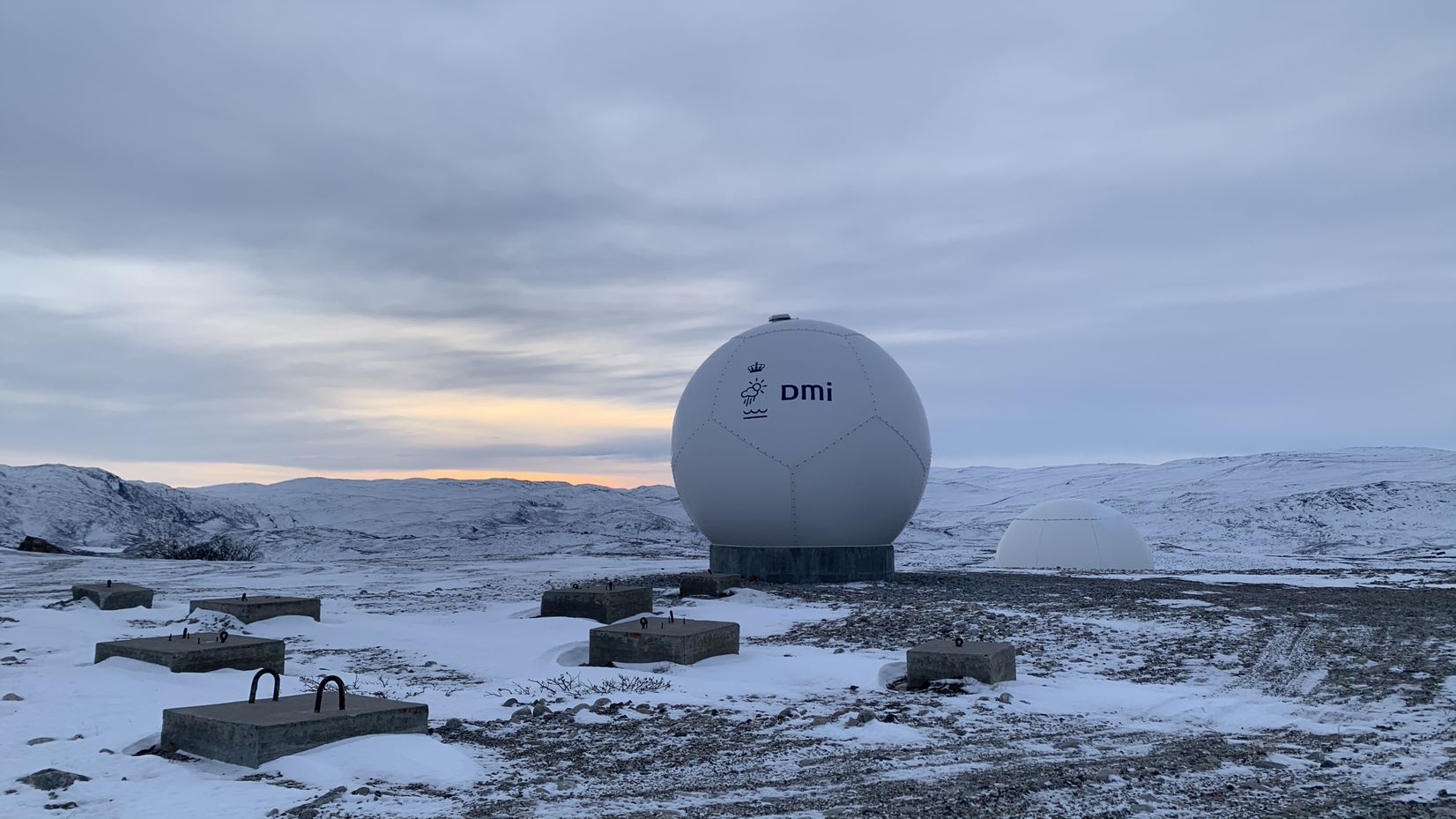
DMI weather station in Kangerlussuaq, Greenland.

DMI has a large catalog of weather and ocean observation stations across the kingdom.

- 60 Air Temperature stations
- 61 Relative Humidity stations
- 57 Wind speed and direction stations
- 52 Air Pressure stations
- 257 Precipitation stations
- 27 Cloud Coverage stations
- 34 Visibility stations
- 28 Radiation and Sunshine stations
- 17 Soil Temperature stations
- 81 Snow Depth stations
- 11+ Water Temperature stations

== See also ==
- North West Shelf Operational Oceanographic System
- NinJo workstation used by DMI
- Doppler weather radar
- Niels Hoffmeyer, the first director
