= William Henry Giles Kingston =

English writer (1814–1880)

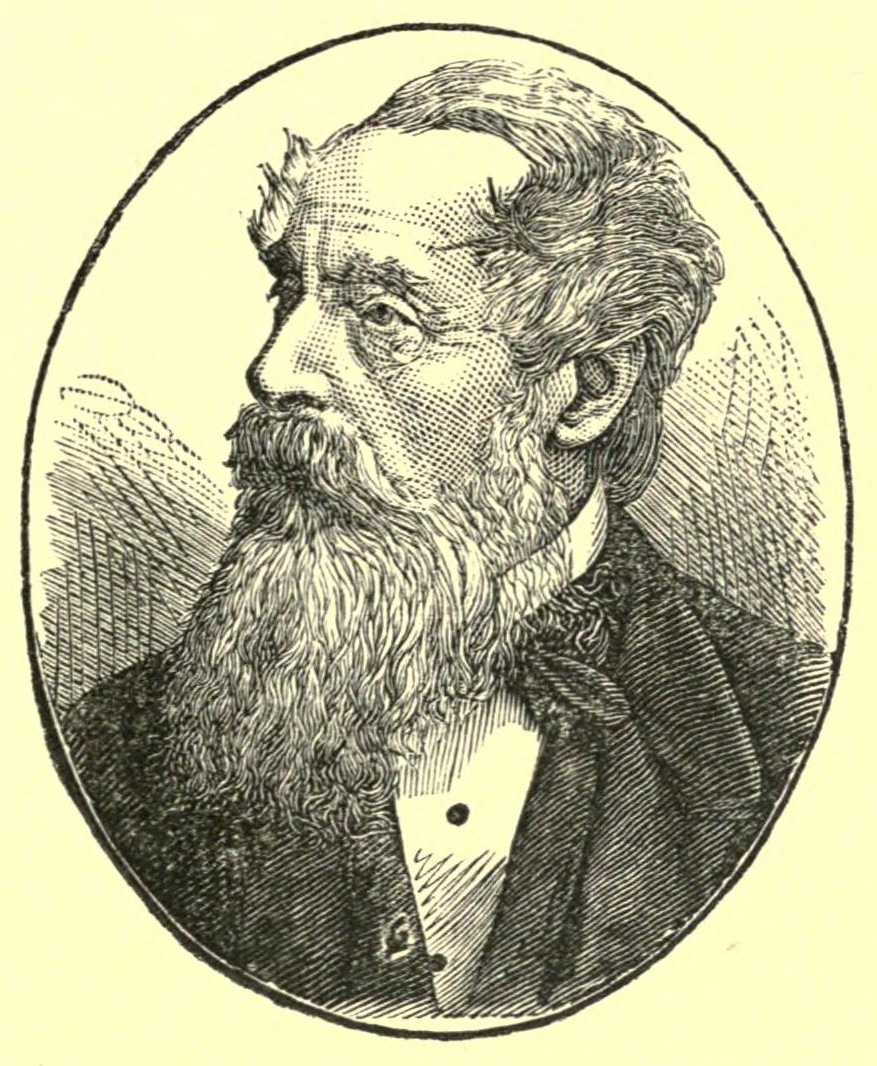
- Kingston in an 1884 portrait
- Born: 28 February 1814; Westminster, London, England
- Died: 5 August 1880 (aged 66); Willesden, Middlesex (now London), England
- Occupation: Writer
- Writing career
- Period: 19th century
- Genre: Children's literature

William Henry Giles Kingston (28 February 1814 – 5 August 1880), often credited as W. H. G. Kingston, was an English writer of boys' adventure novels.

== Life ==
William Henry Giles Kingston was born in Harley Street, London on 28 February 1814. He was the eldest son of Lucy Henry Kingston (d.1852) and his wife Frances Sophia Rooke (b.1789), daughter of Sir Giles Rooke, Judge of the Court of Common Pleas. Kingston's paternal grandfather John Kingston (1736–1820) was a Member of Parliament who staunchly supported the Abolition of the Slave Trade, despite having a plantation in Demerara. His father Lucy entered into the wine business in Porto, and Kingston lived there for many years, making frequent voyages to England and developing a lifelong affection for the sea.

Kingston entered his father's wine business, but soon indulged in his natural bent for writing. His newspaper articles on Portugal were translated into Portuguese, and assisted the conclusion of the commercial treaty with Portugal in 1842, when he received from Donna Maria da Gloria an order of Portuguese knighthood and a pension.

His first book was The Circassian Chief, a story published in 1844. While still living in Porto, he wrote The Prime Minister, a historical novel based loosely on the life of Sebastião José de Carvalho e Melo, 1st Marquis of Pombal, and Lusitanian Sketches, descriptions of travels in Portugal. Settling in England, he interested himself in the emigration movement, edited The Colonist and The Colonial Magazine and East India Review in 1844, was honorary secretary of a colonisation society, wrote Some Suggestions for a System of General Emigration in 1848, lectured on colonisation in 1849, published a manual for colonists entitled How to Emigrate in 1850, and visited the western highlands on behalf of the emigration commissioners. He was afterwards a zealous volunteer and worked actively for the improvement of the condition of seamen. But from 1850, his chief occupation was writing books for boys, or editing boys' annuals and weekly periodicals. He started the Union Jack, a paper for boys, only a few months before his death. His stories number more than a hundred; the best known are:

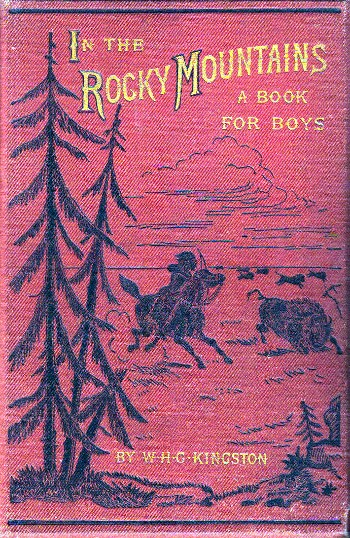
Cover of In the Rocky Mountains written by W. H. G. Kingston

- Peter the Whaler, 1851
- Blue Jackets, 1854
- Digby Heathcote, 1860
- The Cruise of the Frolic, 1860
- The Fireships, 1862
- The Midshipman Marmaduke Merry, 1863
- Foxholme Hall, 1867
- Ben Burton, 1872
- The Three Midshipmen, 1873
- The Three Lieutenants, 1876
- The Three Commanders, 1876
- The Three Admirals, 1878
- Kidnapping in the Pacific, 1879
- Hendriks the Hunter, 1884
- Happy Jack, and Other Tales of the Sea, 1889

He travelled widely on the ordinary routes of travel, and described his experience for the young in:

- Western Wanderings. Or, a pleasure tour in the Canadas, 1856
- My Travels in Many Lands, 1862 (France, Italy and Portugal)
- "In The Eastern Seas", 1871
- The Western World, 1874
- A Yacht Voyage Round England, 1879

His popular records of adventure and of discovery included:

- Captain Cook: His Life, Voyages, and Discoveries, 1871
- Great African Travellers, 1874
- Popular History of the Navy, 1876
- Notable Voyages from Columbus to Parry, 1880
- Adventures in the Far West, 1881
- Adventures in Africa, 1883
- Adventures in India, 1884
- Adventures in Australia, 1885
- Travels of Dr. Livingstone (also known as Livingstone's Travels), 1886
- Travels of Mungo Park, Denham and Clapperton, 1886

He published translations of several of Jules Verne's stories from the French (see below on the actual translator), and wrote many historical tales dealing with almost all periods and countries, from Eldol the Druid (1874) and Jovinian, a tale of Early Papal Rome (1877) downwards, and undertook some popular historical compilations such as Half-Hours with the Kings and Queens of England (1876).

He rewrote Richard Johnson's 1596 book The Seven Champions of Christendom to bring the language into more contemporary English.

His writings occupy nine pages and a half of the British Museum Catalogue. They were very popular; his tales were quite innocuous, but most of them proved ephemeral. Feeling his health failing, he wrote a farewell letter on 2 August 1880 in touching terms to the boys for whom he had written so much and so long, and died three days later at Stormont Lodge, Willesden, near London.

=== Family life ===
On 4 August 1853, Kingston married Agnes Kinloch, daughter of Captain Charles Kinloch of the 52nd Light Infantry who had served in the Peninsular War as aide-de-camp to General Sir John Hope. Their honeymoon was spent in Canada, where Kingston acquired the background for many of his later novels, and they spent their first Christmas at Quebec City with the family of William Collis Meredith, Chief Justice of Quebec. Agnes Kinloch was privately educated, as was the custom of the time. She sang well, was an accomplished musician, studied art and languages in Europe, and spoke both French and German fluently, a skill which was to be of benefit during her husband's later financial troubles. She bore her husband eight children but all died early, and this branch of the family is now extinct.

Kingston's brother George Kingston (1816–1886) was a Canadian professor, meteorologist, author, and public servant. He has been called the father of Canadian Meteorology for successfully promoting and organising one of Canada's first national scientific services.

=== Financial troubles and translations of Jules Verne ===
Beginning in 1860, Kingston suffered a number of financial reverses resulting from his publishing activities and, by 1868, he was very nearly bankrupt. In fact, he was forced to accept a grant of £50 from the Royal Literary Fund and, a few months later, £100 from the Queen's Civil List. The financial troubles continued and resulted in Kingston living as a recluse during the last ten years of his life.

Beginning in the 1870s, Kingston entered into a contract with publishers Sampson Low and Marston to translate some works of French author Jules Verne. These are the works for which Kingston is most remembered today. They were all published under his name, but the translations were actually done by his wife Agnes Kinloch Kingston. This fact was generally known in literary circles, and actually mentioned in Mrs. Kingston's obituary in 1913, but it was apparently forgotten until it was revived in the 20th Century edition of the Dictionary of National Biography in 2004. The Verne books which Mrs. Kingston translated are:

- The Mysterious Island, Sampson Low et al., 3 volumes: 1875, reprinted by Scribner, Armstrong, & Co., New York, 1 volume: 1876
- Michael Strogoff, Sampson Low et al.: 1876, reprinted by Scribner, Armstrong, & Co., "revised by Julius Chambers": 1877
- The Child of the Cavern; or Strange Doings Underground, Sampson Low et al.: 1877
- The Begum's Fortune; with an account of The Mutineers of the Bounty, Sampson Low et al.: 1879, reprinted by J. B. Lippincott: 1879

Kingston died at his family home at 3 Brondesbury Villas, Willesden, Middlesex on 5 August 1880, and his death was registered four days later by H. C. Kingston, "present at the death". The cause of death was cited on his death certificate as "Cancer of Kidney, Time not known, Certified by J. F. Anderson MD."

== Popularity ==
His first book The Circassian Chief appeared in 1844. His first book for boys Peter the Whaler was published in 1851 and had such success that he retired from business and devoted himself entirely to the production of this kind of literature and, during 30 years, he wrote upwards of 130 tales, including:

- The Three Midshipmen (1862),
- The Three Lieutenants (1874),
- The Three Commanders (1875),
- The Three Admirals (1877),
- Digby Heathcote, etc.

He also wrote a tale about the notorious outlaw Ninco Nanco called Ninco Nanco, The Neapolitan Brigand, from Foxholme Hall.

He also conducted various papers, including The Colonist and Colonial Magazine and East India Review. He was also interested in emigration, volunteering, and various philanthropic schemes. He received a Portuguese knighthood for services in negotiating a commercial treaty with Portugal, and a Government pension for his literary labours.

He is mentioned by Robert Louis Stevenson in the poem prefacing Treasure Island:

If studious youth no longer crave,
His ancient appetites forgot,
Kingston, or Ballantyne the brave,
Or Cooper of the wood and wave ...

== List of titles ==
- The Circassian Chief: A Romance of Russia. 3 vol. London: Bentley, 1843.
- The Prime Minister: An Historical Romance. 3 vol. London: Bentley, 1845.
- The Albatross: or, Voices from the Ocean. A Tale of the Sea. 3 vol. London: Henry Hurst, 1849.
- The Pirate of the Mediterranean: A Tale of the Sea. 3 vol. London: T. C. Newby, 1851.
- The Ocean Queen and the Spirit of the Storm: A New Fairy Tale of the Southern Seas. 1 vol. London: Bosworth, 1851.
- Peter the Whaler: His Early Life and Adventures in the Arctic Regions. 1 vol. London: Grant and Griffith, 1851.
- Mark Seaworth: A Tale of the Indian Ocean. 1 vol. London: Grant and Griffith, 1852.
- Manco, the Peruvian Chief: or, An Englishman's Adventures in the Country of the Incas. 1 vol. London: Grant and Griffith, 1853.
- Salt Water: or, Sea Life and Adventures of Neil D'Arcy, the Midshipman. 1 vol. London: Grant and Griffith, 1857.
- Fred Markham in Russia: or, The Boy Travellers in the Land of the Czar. 1 vol. London: Griffith and Farran, 1858.
- Old Jack: A Man-of-War's-Man and South-Sea Whaler. 1 vol. Edinburgh: Nelson and Sons, 1859.
- Round the World: A Tale for Boys. 1 vol. Edinburgh: Nelson and Sons, 1859.
- The Early Life of Old Jack: A Sea Tale. 1 vol. Edinburgh: Nelson and Sons, 1859.
- The Cruise of the Frolic: or, Yachting Experiences of Barnaby Brine, Esq., R.N.. 2 vol. London: Sampson Low, 1860.
- Digby Heathcote: or, The Early Days of a County Gentleman's Son and Heir. 1 vol. London: Routledge, 1860.
- My First Voyage to Southern Seas. 1 vol. Edinburgh: Nelson and Sons, 1860.
- Will Weatherhelm: or, The Yarn of an Old Sailor about his Early Life and Adventures. 1 vol. London: Griffith and Farran, 1860.
- Ernest Bracebridge: or, Schoolboy Days. 1 vol. London: Sampson Low, 1860.
- Jack Buntline: or, Life on the Ocean. 1 vol. London: Sampson Low, 1861.
- The Fire-Ships: A Tale of the Last Naval War. 3 vol. London: Sampson Low, 1862.
- True Blue: or, The Life and Adventures of a British Seaman of the Old School. 1 vol. London: Griffith and Farran, 1862.
- Marmaduke Merry the Midshipman: or, My Early Days at Sea. 1 vol. London: W. Kent and Co., 1862.
- Adventures of Dick Onslow among the Red Skins. 1 vol. London: Dean and Son, 1863.
- The Three Midshipmen. 1 vol. London: Routledge, 1863.
- Tales for all ages. 1 vol. London: Bickers and Bush, 1863.
- The Log House by the Lake: A Tale of Canada. 1 vol. London: S. P. C. K., 1864.
- The Gilpins and their Fortunes: An Australian Tale. 1 vol. London: S. P. C. K., 1865.
- Philip Mavor: or, Life amongst the Kaffirs. 1 vol. London: S. P. C. K., 1865.
- Rob Nixon, the Old White Trapper: A Tale of Central British North America. 1 vol. London: S. P. C. K., 1865.
- Antony Waymouth: or, The Gentlemen Adventurers. A Chronicle of the Sea. 1 vol. London: Frederick Warne, 1865.
- Mountain Moggy: or, The Stoning of the Witch. A Tale for the Young. 1 vol. London: S. P. C. K., 1866.
- Washed Ashore: or, The Tower of Stormount Bay. 1 vol. London: Jackson, Walford and Hodder, 1866.
- My First Cruise. 1 vol. London: Cassell, 1866.
- Foxholme Hall: A Legend of Christmas and Other Amusing Tales for Boys. 1 vol. London: Virtue, 1867.
- Paul Gerrard, the Cabin Boy. 1 vol. London: Routledge, 1867.
- Ralph Clavering: or, We must try before we can do. 1 vol. London: Frederick Warne, 1867.
- Three Hundred Years Ago: or, The Martyr of Brentwood. 1 vol. London: Partridge, 1868.
- Count Ulrich von Lindburg: A Tale of the Reformation in Germany. 1 vol. London: Partridge, 1868.
- The Perils and Adventures of Harry Skipwith by Sea and Land. 1 vol. London: Virtue, 1868.
- The Pirates' Treasure: A Legend of Panama. 1 vol. London: Virtue, 1868.
- The Last Look: A Tale of the Spanish Inquisition. 1 vol. London: Partridge, 1869.
- Our Fresh and Salt Water Tutors: A Story of that Good Old Time Our School Days at the Cape. 1 vol. London: Sampson Low, 1869.
- Adrift in a Boat. 1 vol. London: Hodder and Stoughton, 1869.
- The Royal Merchant: or, Events in the Days of Sir Thomas Gresham. 1 vol. London: Partridge, 1870.
- John Deane of Nottingham: His Adventures and Exploits. A Tale of the Times of William of Orange and Queen Anne. 1 vol. London: Griffith and Farran, 1870.
- Sunshine Bill. 1 vol. London: S. P. C. K., 1870.
- At the South Pole: or, The Adventures of Richard Pengelley, Mariner. 1 vol. London: Cassell, 1870.
- Little Ben Hadden: or, Do Right, Whatever Comes of It. 1 vol. London: R. T. S., 1870.
- Off to Sea: or, The Adventures of Jovial Jack Junker on his Road to Fame. 1 vol. London: Cassell, 1870.
- In the Eastern Seas: or, The Regions of the Bird of Paradise. A Tale for Boys. 1 vol. Edinburgh: Nelson and Sons, 1871.
- In the Wilds of Africa: A Tale for Boys. 1 vol. Edinburgh: Nelson and Sons, 1871.
- A True Hero: or, The Story of William Penn. 1 vol. London: Sunday School Union, 1871.
- On the Banks of the Amazon: or, A Boy's Journal of his Adventures in the Tropical Wilds of South America. 1 vol. Edinburgh: Nelson and Sons, 1872.
- The Fortunes of the "Ranger" and "Crusader": A Tale of Two Ships, and the Adventures of their Passengers and Crews. 1 vol. Edinburgh: Gall & Inglis, 1872.
- Ben Burton: or, Born and Bred at Sea. 1 vol. London: Sampson Low, 1872.
- The Trapper's Son. 1 vol. Edinburgh: Gall & Inglis, 1873.
- The African Trader: or, The Adventures of Harry Bayford. 1 vol. Edinburgh: Gall & Inglis, 1873.
- Michael Penguyne: or, Fisher Life on the Cornish Coast. 1 vol. London: S. P. C. K., 1873.
- Janet M'Laren: or, The Faithful Nurse. 1 vol. Edinburgh: Gall & Inglis, 1873.
- The History of Little Peter the Ship-boy. 1 vol. London: R. T. S., 1873.
- Archibald Hughson, the Young Shetlander. 1 vol. Edinburgh: Gall & Inglis, 1873.
- Waihoura: or, The New Zealand Girl. 1 vol. Edinburgh: Gall & Inglis, 1873.
- Mary Liddiard: or, The Missionary's Daughter. A Tale of the Pacific. 1 vol. Edinburgh: Gall & Inglis, 1873.
- The Woodcutter of Gutech. 1 vol. London: R. T. S., 1873.
- Milicent Courtenay's Diary: or, The Experiences of a Young Lady at Home and Abroad. 1 vol. Edinburgh: Gall & Inglis, 1873.
- The Heroic Wife: or, The Wanderers on the Amazon. 1 vol. London: Griffith and Farran, 1874.
- Tales of the Sea. 1 vol. Edinburgh: Gall & Inglis, 1874.
- The Two Shipmates. 1 vol. London: S. P. C. K., 1874.
- Roger Kyffin's Ward. 1 vol. London: Routledge, 1874.
- The Merchant of Haarlem: A Tale of King Philip's Reign in the Netherlands. 1 vol. London: Partridge, 1874.
- Eldol the Druid: or, The Dawn of Christianity in Britain. 1 vol. London: Partridge, 1874.
- Charley Laurel: A Story of Adventure by Sea and Land. 1 vol. London: Sunday School Union, 1874.
- Hurricane Hurry: or, The Adventures of a Naval Officer Afloat and on Shore during the American War of Ind. 1 vol. London: Griffith and Farran, 1874.
- The Three Lieutenants: or, Naval Life in the Nineteenth Century. 1 vol. London: Griffith and Farran, 1875.
- The Settlers: A Tale of Virginia. 1 vol. London: S. P. C. K., 1875.
- The South Sea Whaler: A Story of the Loss of the "Champion" and the Adventures of her Crew. 1 vol. Edinburgh: Nelson and Sons, 1875.
- The Child of the Wreck: or, The Loss of the Royal George. 1 vol. London: Griffith and Farran, 1876.
- The Three Commanders: or, Active Service Afloat in Modern Days. 1 vol. London: Griffith and Farran, 1876.
- Twice Lost: A Story of Shipwreck, and of Adventure in the Wilds of Australia. 1 vol. Edinburgh: Nelson and Sons, 1876.
- Snow-Shoes and Canoes: or, The Early Days of a Fur-trader in the Hudson's Bay Territory. 1 vol. Edinburgh: Nelson and Sons, 1876.
- The Young Rajah: A Story of Indian Life and Adventure. 1 vol. Edinburgh: Nelson and Sons, 1876.
- The Wanderers: or, Adventures in the Wilds of Trinidad and up the Orinoco. 1 vol. Edinburgh: Nelson and Sons, 1876.
- Saved from the Sea: or, The Loss of the "Viper," and the Adventures of her Crew in the Great Sahara. 1 vol. Edinburgh: Nelson and Sons, 1876.
- Yachting Tales. 1 vol. London: Hunt & Co., 1877.
- Clara Maynard: or, The True and the False. A Tale of the Times. 1 vol. London: Hodder and Stoughton, 1877.
- Jovinian: or, The Early Days of Papal Rome. A Tale. 1 vol. London: Hodder and Stoughton, 1877.
- The Voyage of the "Steadfast": or, The Young Missionaries in the Pacific. 1 vol. London: R. T. S., 1877.
- The Young Llanero: A Story of War and Wild Life in Venezuela. 1 vol. Edinburgh: Nelson and Sons, 1877.
- The Missing Ship. 1 vol. London: Griffith and Farran, 1877.
- Owen Hartley: or, Ups and Downs. A Tale of the Land and Sea. 1 vol. London: S. P. C. K., 1877.
- With Axe and Rifle: or, The Western Pioneers. 1 vol. London: Sampson Low, 1878.
- The Three Admirals, and the Adventures of their Young Followers. 1 vol. London: Griffith and Farran, 1878.
- In the Rocky Mountains: A Tale of Adventure. 1 vol. Edinburgh: Nelson and Sons, 1878.
- The Two Supercargoes: or, Adventures in Savage Africa. 1 vol. London: Sampson Low, 1878.
- The Mate of the "Lily": or, Notes from Harry Musgrave's Log Book. 1 vol. London: S. P. C. K., 1878.
- Ned Garth: or, Made Prisoner in Africa. A Tale of the Slave Trade. 1 vol. London: S. P. C. K., 1878.
- The Frontier Fort: or, Stirring Times in the Northwest Territory of British America. 1 vol. London: S. P. C. K., 1879.
- The Rival Crusoes. 1 vol. London: Griffith and Farran, 1879.
- Kidnapping in the Pacific: or, The Adventures of Boas Ringdon. A Long Yarn in Four Lengths. 1 vol. London: Routledge, 1879.
- In New Granada: or, Heroes and Patriots. A Tale for Boys. 1 vol. Edinburgh: Nelson and Sons, 1879.
- The Cruise of the Dainty, 1880
- The Boy who Sailed with Blake: and, The Orphans. 1 vol. London: Sunday School Union, 1880.
- Voyages and Travels of Count Funnibos and Baron Stilkin. 1 vol. London: S. P. C. K., 1880.
- Dick Cheveley: His Adventures and Misadventures. 1 vol. London: Sampson Low, 1880.
- Norman Vallery: or, How to Overcome Evil with Good. 1 vol. Edinburgh: Gall & Inglis, 1880.
- The Ferryman of Brill and Other Stories. 1 vol. London: Cassell, 1880.
- The Young Berringtons: or, The Boy Explorers. 1 vol. London: Cassell, 1880.
- The Lily of Leyden. 1 vol. London: S. P. C. K., 1880.
- The Two Voyages: or, Midnight and Daylight. 1 vol. London: R. T. S., 1881.
- Adventures in the Far West. 1 vol. London: Routledge, 1881.
- Roger Willoughby: or, The Times of Benbow. A Tale of the Sea and Land. 1 vol. London: James Nisbet, 1881.
- The Heir of Kilfinnan: A Tale of the Shore and Ocean. 1 vol. London: Sampson Low, 1881.
- Peter Biddulph: The Rise and Progress of an Australian Settler. 1 vol. London: Sunday School Union, 1881.
- Peter Trawl: or, The Adventures of a Whaler. 1 vol. London: Hodder and Stoughton, 1881.
- James Braithwaite, the Supercargo: The Story of his Adventures Ashore and Afloat. 1 vol. London: Hodder and Stoughton, 1882.
- Arctic Adventures. 1 vol. London: Routledge, 1882.
- Paddy Finn: or, The Adventures of a Midshipman Afloat and Ashore. 1 vol. London: Griffith and Farran, 1883.
- Adventures in Africa by an African Trader. 1 vol. London: Routledge, 1883.
- Won from the Waves: or, The Story of Maiden May. 1 vol. London: Griffith and Farran, 1883.
- From Powder Monkey to Admiral: A Story of Naval Adventure. 1 vol. London: Hodder and Stoughton, 1883.
- Adventures in India. 1 vol. London: Routledge, 1884.
- Villegagnon: A Tale of the Huguenot Persecution. 1 vol. London: Sunday School Union, 1886.
