= George Kingston (meteorologist) =

Canadian meteorologist

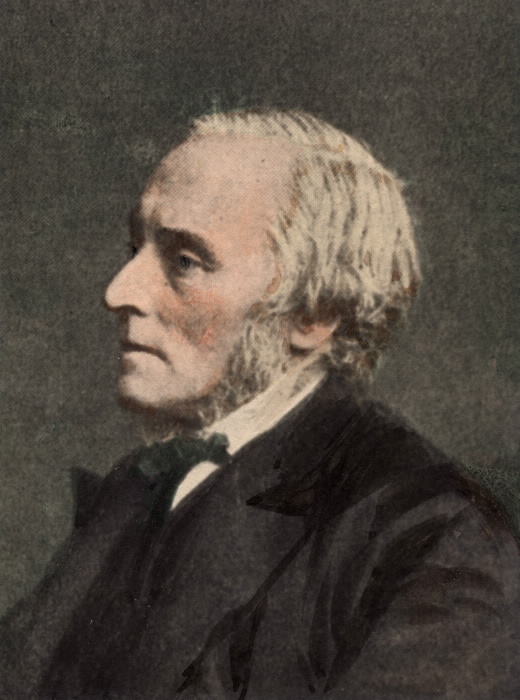
- George T. Kingston (photographie retouchée à l'aquarelle publiée en 1890).
- Born: October 5, 1816; Porto (Portugal)
- Died: January 21, 1886 (aged 69); Toronto (Canada)
- Occupation: Meteorologist; professor
- Relatives: William Henry Giles Kingston

George Templeman Kingston (1816–1886) was a Canadian professor, meteorologist, author, and public servant. For successfully promoting and organizing one of Canada's first national scientific services, Kingston has been called the father of Canadian Meteorology.

== Biography ==
George Kingston was born at the British Factory Chaplaincy, Porto, Portugal on 5 October 1816, a son of British wine merchant Lucy Henry Kingston and his wife Frances Sophia Rooke, and grandson on his mother's side of Sir Giles Rooke, Justice of the Court of Common Pleas, England. His brother was author William Henry Giles Kingston. He attended Cambridge University, graduating with honours in mathematics in 1846, and was awarded an M.A. in 1849. In February 1851, he married Harriette Malone (1829-1899), daughter of Edward Malone Esq., at East Stonehouse, Plymouth, Devon, England; they had one son, George Malcolm (born at Quebec, Canada, June 1854).

After teaching at Eton College for some time, he came to Canada in 1852 to take the position of Principal of the Nautical College at Quebec City. When that school closed in May 1855, he began his association with the University of Toronto and the Magnetic Observatory. Recognizing the need for a true description of Canada's climatology, in 1871 Kingston persuaded the government of the advantage of a network of stations to observe and issue storm warnings. This was the beginning of a national meteorological service, which by late 1872 extended from Halifax to Winnipeg. In October 1876, the first storm warning prepared in Canada was issued, and in 1877, the first general forecast. The weather predictions were telegraphed to 75 cities and towns in Canada each day and bulletins were then posted. Storm warnings were the more important then and these bulletins were displayed to mariners and sailors by combinations of wicker baskets hung on poles at ports and harbours on the Great Lakes, the St. Lawrence Seaway, and the Atlantic Coast of Canada.

George Templeman Kingston retired from his posts in 1880, and died of pneumonia on 21 January 1886, at Toronto, Ontario.
