= Horsley, Gloucestershire =

Village in Gloucestershire, England

Coordinates: 51.681°N 2.235°W

Horsley
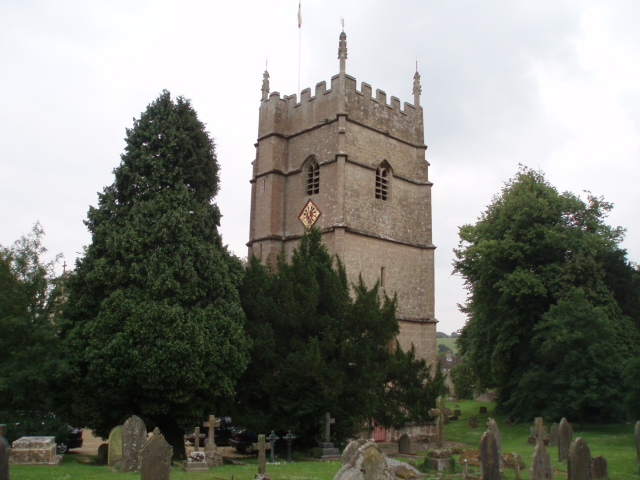
- St Martin's Church, Horsley

- Location within Gloucestershire
- Population: 820
- OS grid reference: ST830980
- District: Stroud
- Shire county: Gloucestershire
- Region: South West
- Country: England
- Sovereign state: United Kingdom
- Post town: Stroud
- Postcode district: GL6
- Dialling code: 01453
- Police: Gloucestershire
- Fire: Gloucestershire
- Ambulance: South Western
- UK Parliament: Stroud

Horsley is a village and civil parish about one and a half miles south-west of the small Cotswold market town of Nailsworth. The origins of the name Horsley are much debated, although it is thought to be derived from the pre-7th-century Old English phrase, "horse-lega", meaning "place of horses".

A habitation was recorded in 1327 at Barton End, named after a barton on the manor estate. The village sprung from cross-roads east of St Martin Church. The Parish is bisected from south to north by the Bath-Gloucester, built in 1780.

== History ==
Historically Horsley had a prison, part of which is now a house, the exercise yard now a garden.

Horsley Court on Narrowcut Lane dates back to c1690. The house was altered and enlarged c1820, with a central tower added in c1850. It was built for the Webb family of clothiers.

== Geography ==
In the parish is the hamlet of Newmarket, Gloucestershire.

== Facilities ==
Horsley has a C of E Primary School and church, a community shop, a playground and sports field, a village hall, Ruskin Mill College (part of Ruskin Mill Trust), and a pub, The Hog (formerly the Bell & Castle). St Martin's Church also serves as the Primary School hall and a performance space for the community and surrounding area.

== Publications ==
Horsley's monthly newsletter, 'The Horse's Mouth' provides local news and serves as the church's parish magazine.
