= Newmarket, Gloucestershire =

Hamlet in Gloucestershire, England

Coordinates: 51°41′44″N 2°14′00″W

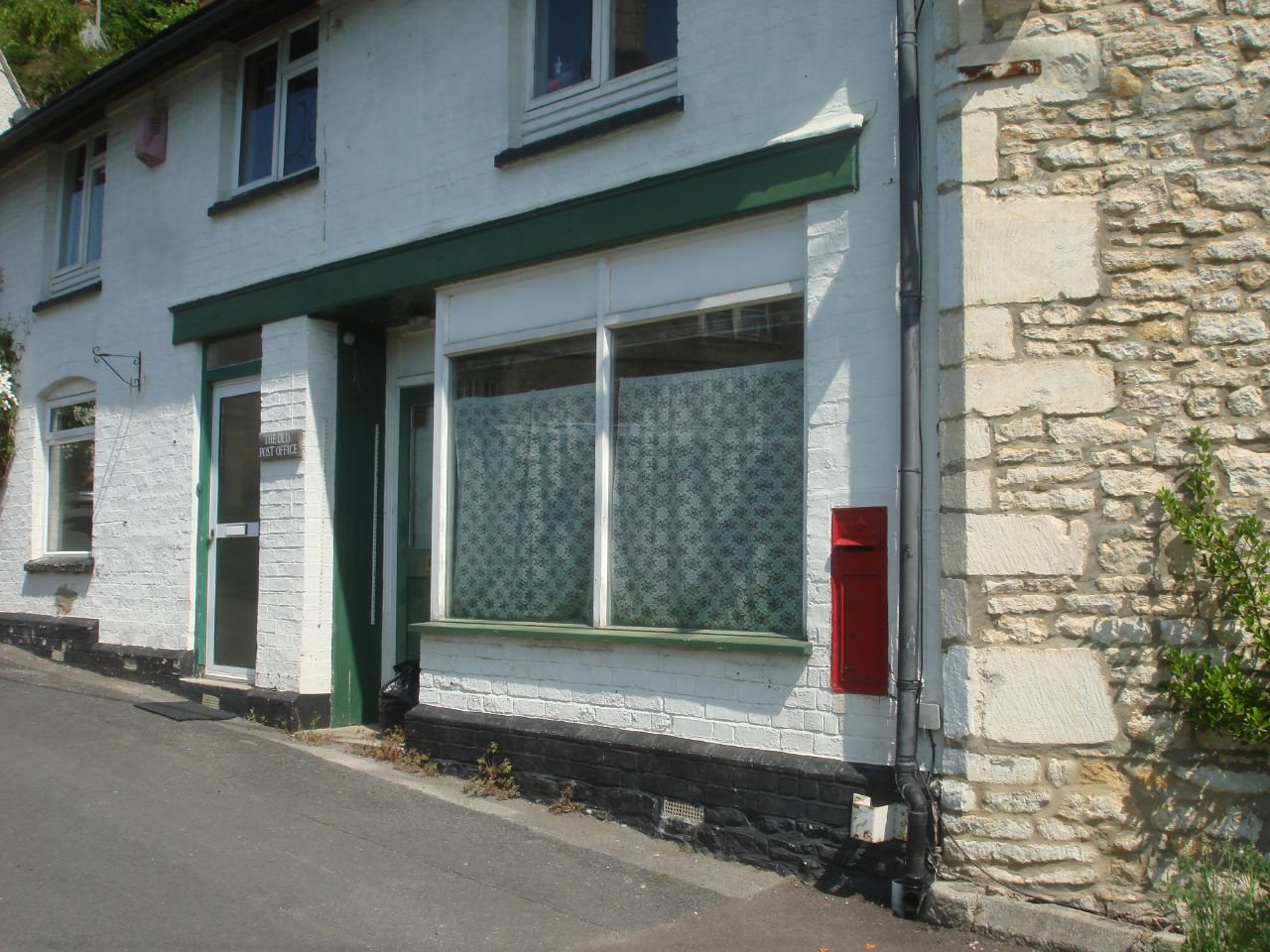
Newmarket Post Office

Newmarket is a hamlet in the parish of Horsley, Gloucestershire, England.

== Politics ==
Newmarket is part of the Stroud parliamentary constituency for elections to the House of Commons. The local MP is currently Simon Opher from the Labour Party.
