= GME of Deutscher Wetterdienst =

Global numerical weather prediction model

GME (Globales Modell) was an operational global numerical weather prediction model run by Deutscher Wetterdienst, the German national meteorological service. The model was run using an almost uniform icosahedral-hexagonal grid. The GME grid point approach avoided the disadvantages of spectral techniques as well as the pole problem in latitude–longitude grids and provides a data structure well suited to high efficiency on distributed memory parallel computers. The GME replaced two previous models (the GM and EM), and was first run on 1 December 1999.

== Approach ==
The GME's approach to a global grid would later be utilized by the Flow-following, finite-volume Icosahedral Model (FIM), an experimental model currently in development in the United States.

The GME was replaced by the ICON (Icosahedral Nonhydrostatic) model on 20 January 2015. ICON uses the same icosahedral approach, but has a higher resolution at 13 km. Various unofficial websites distribute ICON model data, including Tropical Tidbits and Windy. The ICON-EU regional nest became operational in December 2016, and the higher-resolution ICON-D2 followed in February 2021. In January 2024 the model became open source.
