= Giles Rooke =

English judge

Sir Giles Rooke (1743–1808) was an English judge.

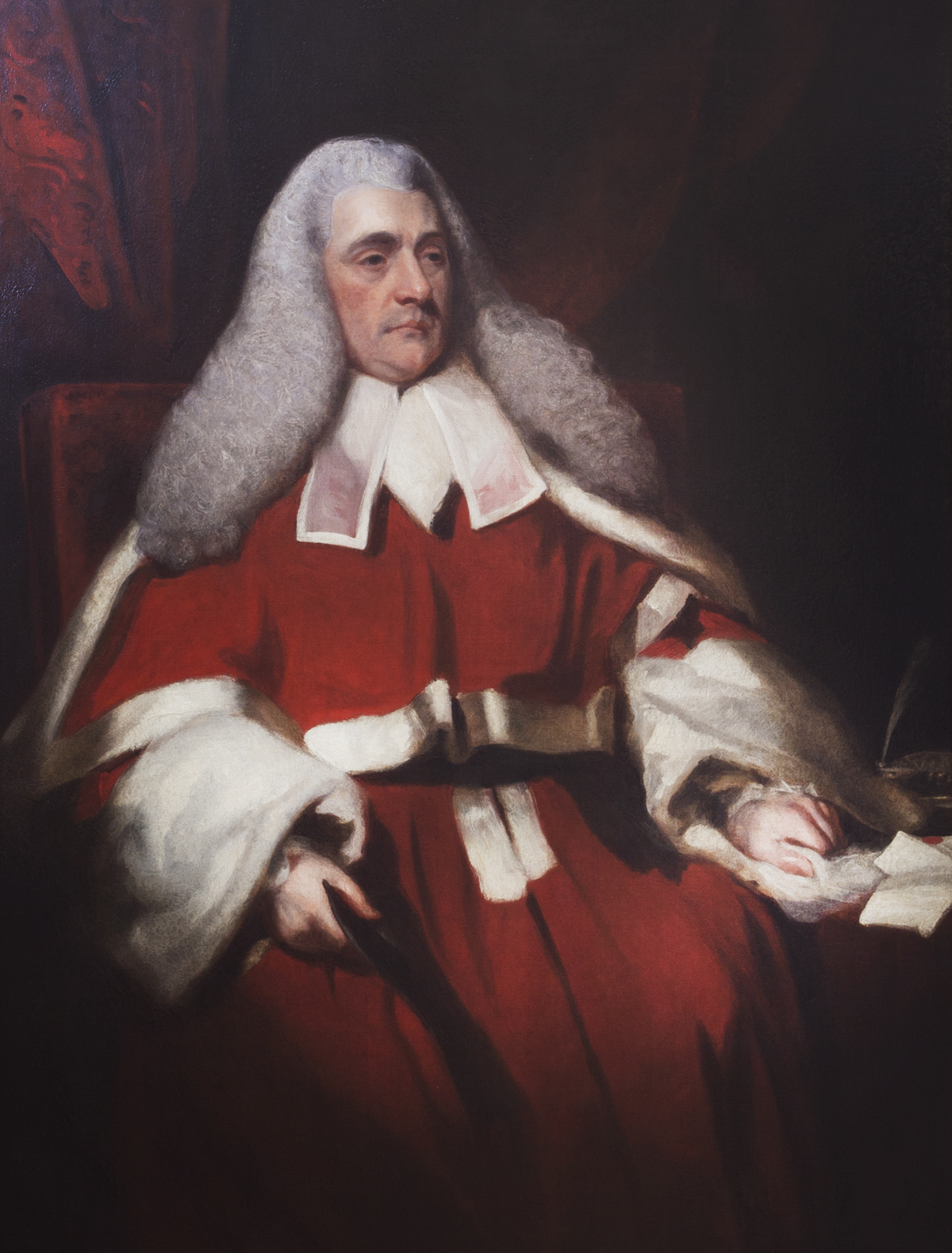
Giles Rooke, by John Hoppner

== Early life ==
The third son of Giles Rooke, a merchant of London and director of the East India Company, by Frances, daughter of Leonard Cropp (1710–1785) of Southampton, he was born on 3 June 1743. He was educated at Harrow School and matriculated at St John's College, Oxford on 26 November 1759, graduating B.A. in 1763. He proceeded M.A. in 1766, and in the same year was elected to a fellowship at Merton College, which he held until 1785.

== Legal career ==
Rooke was also called to the bar at Lincoln's Inn in 1766, and went the Western Circuit. In 1781 he was called to the degree of serjeant-at-law, and in April 1793 was made king's serjeant. At the next Exeter assizes he prosecuted to conviction William Winterbotham, a dissenting minister at Plymouth accused of preaching seditious sermons. He claimed in the trial that talk of rights of man was blasphemous.

On 13 November 1793, Rooke was appointed to the puisne judgeship of the Court of Common Pleas, left vacant by the death of John Wilson. At the same time he was knighted. He presided at the trial at the York Lent assizes in 1795 of Henry Redhead Yorke for conspiracy against the government.

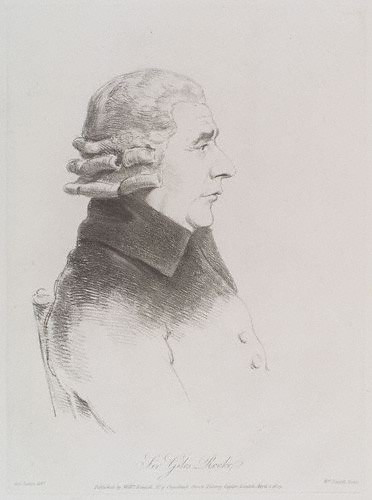
Giles Rooke, by William Daniell after George Dance, published 1809

== Works ==
Rooke was author of Thoughts on the Propriety of fixing Easter Term, 1792 (anon.)

== Death and family ==
Rooke died on 7 March 1808. He left a large family by his wife, Harriet Sophia Burrard (d. 1839), whom he married in 1785. She was the sister of Admiral Sir Harry Burrard Neale 2nd Bt., of Walhampton, and the daughter of Colonel William Burrard of Walhampton, Hampshire, Governor of Yarmouth Castle. William Henry Giles Kingston, son of Lucy Henry Kingston and his wife Frances Sophia Rooke, was a grandson.
