= André Robert =

Canadian meteorologist (1929–1993)

André J. Robert
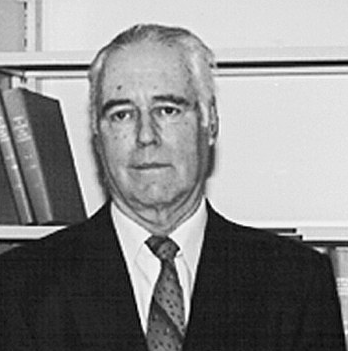
- André Robert circa 1992.
- Born: April 28, 1929; New York, New York, United States
- Died: November 18, 1993 (aged 64); Montreal, Quebec, Canada
- Education: B.Sc., Laval University, 1952 M.Sc., University of Toronto, 1953 Ph.D., McGill University, 1965
- Scientific career
- Fields: Meteorology
- Thesis: An evaluation of the behaviour of planetary waves in an atmospheric model based on spherical harmonics (1965)
- Doctoral advisor: Byron Walter Boville

Dr. André Robert (April 28, 1929 – November 18, 1993) was a Canadian meteorologist who pioneered the modelling the Earth's atmospheric circulation.

== Biography and career ==
Born in New York, NY in 1928, Robert moved to Grand-Mère, Quebec, in May 1937. He received his BSc from Laval University in 1952 and his MSc from the University of Toronto in 1953. He began employment with the Meteorological Service of Canada as a weather forecaster, then in 1959 shifted his interest to research in atmospheric models for short and medium-range numerical weather prediction.

For his PhD (awarded in 1965), Robert worked at McGill University on the spectral model using spectral harmonics for the representation of atmospheric fields in global climate and numerical weather prediction models.

Between 1963 and 1970, Robert developed the semi-implicit time integration algorithm for an efficient integration of the primitive equations for numerical weather prediction and climate models. Several weather centres in the world adopted this algorithm for their models (Canada in 1974, Australia in 1976, ECMWF in 1977, USA in 1980).

In 1970-71 Robert was briefly a professor in the Department of Meteorology at McGill University, Montreal, but then became Director of Research in Numerical Prediction, then Director of the Canadian Meteorological Centre in 1973. In 1980, Robert successfully combined his semi-implicit scheme with existing Lagrangian techniques which allows the use of much longer time steps and hence produces a very efficient integration of meteorological equations.

Robert retired from the Canadian Meteorological Centre in Montreal in 1987 and took a Faculty position at the Université du Québec à Montréal. There he worked with colleagues to develop a fully elastic atmospheric model that relaxed the hydrostatic approximation used by all large-scale climate and numerical weather prediction models, thus paving the way to a universal model formulation usable at all scales. The resulting model came to be known by the name of Mesoscale Compressible Community model (MC^{2}).

Robert's career was devoted to developing and implementing numerical techniques to solve the interacting time-dependent partial differential equations governing the chronological development of atmospheric behavior in an efficient manner, while still retaining accuracy; in contrast to many scientists who were concerned only with precision.

André Robert died of cardiac arrest in November 19, 1993.

== International influence ==
During his career, André Robert held several positions in national and international organizations:

- In 1968-69, he was a visiting professor at the American meteorologists training center in Washington, D.C.
- From 1968 to 1972, he was a member of the meteorology and atmospheric sciences subcommittee on the National Research Council of Canada.
- From 1970 to 1976, Dr. Robert was a member of the working group on numerical weather prediction of the World Meteorological Organization (WMO) and became its president in 1973.
- From 1972 to 1976 he was editor of publications of the WMO in numerical weather prediction.
- In 1972-1973, he was President of the Canadian Meteorological and Oceanographic Society. At the same time, he was president of the group for the organization of a WMO conference on the subgrid parameterization in Leningrad (USSR), and another on modeling in Tallahassee (Florida).
- In 1974, he chaired the International Symposium on Spectral Methods in Numerical Weather Prediction in Copenhagen, Denmark. In 1975, he was a member of the Canadian delegation to the Seventh World Meteorological Organization Congress. From 1980 to 1983, he was a member of the selection committee for fellowships in meteorology, astronomy and Aeronomy of the Natural Sciences and Engineering Research Council.

== Awards ==
Dr. Robert received these Awards:

- 1967 and 1971, president of the jury for the awards from the Canadian Meteorological and Oceanography Society.
- 1968, made Fellow of the American Meteorological Society.
- 1981, prize of the second half of the twentieth century bestowed by the American Meteorological Society.
- 1982, made Fellow of the Royal Society of Canada.
- 1986, received the Patterson Medal from the Atmospheric Environment Service (former name of the Meteorological Service of Canada).
- From 1987 to 1993, Emeritus researcher to the Atmospheric Environment Service.
André Robert Publications
- Rivest, Chantal; Staniforth, Andrew; Robert, André (February 1994). "Spurious Resonant Response of Semi-Lagrangian Discretizations to Orographic Forcing: Diagnosis and Solution". Monthly Weather Review. 122 (2): 366–376. Bibcode:1994MWRv..122..366R. doi:10.1175/1520-0493(1994)122<0366:SRROSL>2.0.CO;2.
- Robert, André (1997). "Incompressible Homogeneous Fluids". Atmosphere-Ocean. 35 (Supplement 2): S17–S35. doi:10.1080/07055900.1997.9687368.
- Robert, A., 1993 : Le schéma semi-lagrangien. Recherche note. 6 p.
- Robert, A., 1993 : Application of a semi-Lagrangian model formulation to non-stationary supersonic flow. Recherche note. 9 p. incl. fig.
- Robert, André (July 1993). "Bubble Convection Experiments with a Semi-implicit Formulation of the Euler Equations". Journal of the Atmospheric Sciences. 50 (13): 1865–1873. Bibcode:1993JAtS...50.1865R. doi:10.1175/1520-0469(1993)050<1865:BCEWAS>2.0.CO;2.
- Tanguay, Monique; Yakimiv, Evhen; Ritchie, Harold; Robert, André (January 1992). "Advantages of spatial averaging in semi-implicit semi-Lagrangian schemes". Monthly Weather Review. 120 (1): 113–123. Bibcode:1992MWRv..120..113T. doi:10.1175/1520-0493(1992)120<0113:AOSAIS>2.0.CO;2.
- Jakimow, Georges; Yakimiw, Evhen; Robert, André (January 1992). "An implicit formulation for horizontal diffusion in gridpoint models". Monthly Weather Review. 120 (1): 124–130. Bibcode:1992MWRv..120..124J. doi:10.1175/1520-0493(1992)120<0124:AIFFHD>2.0.CO;2.
- Tanguay, Monique; Robert, André; Laprise, René (October 1990). "A Semi-implicit Semi-Lagrangian Fully Compressible Regional Forecast Model". Monthly Weather Review. 118 (10): 1970–1980. Bibcode:1990MWRv..118.1970T. doi:10.1175/1520-0493(1990)118<1970:ASISLF>2.0.CO;2.
- Yakimiw, E.; Robert, A. (1990). "Validation experiments for a nested grid-point regional forecast model: Research note". Atmosphere-Ocean. 28 (4): 466–472. doi:10.1080/07055900.1990.9649388.
- Tanguay, M.; Robert, A. (1990). "An efficient optimum interpolation analysis scheme". Atmosphere-Ocean. 28 (3): 365–377. doi:10.1080/07055900.1990.9649383.
- Desharnais, Francine; Robert, André (1990). "Errors near the poles generated by a semi‐Lagrangian integration scheme in a global spectral model". Atmosphere-Ocean. 28 (2): 162–176. doi:10.1080/07055900.1990.9649372.
- Bergeron, G., J. Côté and A. Robert, 1990 : Resolution sensitivity experiments with a spectral model of the shallow water equations. Recherche note. 14 p. plus fig. and tables.
- Tanguay, Monique; Robert, André (November 1986). "Elimination of the Helmholtz Equation Associated with the Semi-Implicit Scheme in a Grid Point Model of the Shallow Water Equations". Monthly Weather Review. 114 (11): 2154–2162. Bibcode:1986MWRv..114.2154T. doi:10.1175/1520-0493(1986)114<2154:EOTHEA>2.0.CO;2.
- Yakimiw, Evhen; Robert, André (January 1986). "Accuracy and Stability Analysis of a Fully Implicit Scheme for the Shallow Water Equations". Monthly Weather Review. 114 (1): 240–244. Bibcode:1986MWRv..114..240Y. doi:10.1175/1520-0493(1986)114<0240:AASAOA>2.0.CO;2.
- Robert, André; Yakimiw, Evhen (1986). "Identification and elimination of an inflow boundary computational solution in limited area model integrations". Atmosphere-Ocean. 24 (4): 369–385. doi:10.1080/07055900.1986.9649258.
- Robert, André; Yee, Tai Loy; Ritchie, Harold (March 1985). "A Semi-Lagrangian and Semi-Implicit Numerical Integration Scheme for Multilevel Atmospheric Models". Monthly Weather Review. 113 (3): 388–394. Bibcode:1985MWRv..113..388R. doi:10.1175/1520-0493(1985)113<0388:ASLASI>2.0.CO;2.
- Robert, André (September 1983). The design of efficient time integration schemes for the primitive equations. Seminar on Numerical Methods for Weather Prediction. Vol. 2. Shinfield Park, Reading: European Centre for Medium-Range Weather Forecasts. pp. 193–200.
- Robert, André; Yee, Tai Loy; Ritchie, Harold C. (September 1983). Application of the semi-implicit and semi-Lagrangian integration schemes to a limited area atmospheric model. Seminar on Numerical Methods for Weather Prediction. Vol. 2. Shinfield Park, Reading: European Centre for Medium-Range Weather Forecasts. pp. 201–212.
- Robert, André (1982). "A Semi-Lagrangian and Semi-Implicit Numerical Integration Scheme for the Primitive Meteorological Equations". Journal of the Meteorological Society of Japan. Series II. 60 (1): 319–325. doi:10.2151/jmsj1965.60.1_319.
- Robert, André (1981). "A stable numerical integration scheme for the primitive meteorological equations". Atmosphere-Ocean. 19 (1): 35–46. doi:10.1080/07055900.1981.9649098.
- Robert, André (1979). "Chapter 8: The Semi-implicit method". Numerical methods used in atmospheric models. Global Atmospheric Research Programme (GARP). Vol. II. World Meteorological Organization. pp. 419–437.
- Robert, André (1976). Hartmann, Dennis L.; Merilees, Philip Errol (eds.). Sensitivity experiments for the development of NWP models. Proceedings of the (eleventh) Stanstead Seminar : held at Bishop's University, Lennoxville, Québec, Canada, July 7–11, 1975. Publication in meteorology. Vol. 114. Department of Meteorology, McGill University. pp. 68–81. OCLC 9053677.
- Robert, A., 1974: Garp activities related to computational considerations. WMO Working Group on Numerical Experimentation, Report No. 4, pp. 2–23.
- Robert, A., 1973: Computational resolution requirements for accurate medium-range numerical predictions. Symposium on difference and spectral methods for atmosphere and ocean dynamics problems. Siberian Branch of the Academy of Sciences, Novosibirsk, U.S.S.R., pp. 82–102.
- Robert, André; Henderson, John; Turnbull, Colin (May 1972). "An Implicit Time Integration Scheme for Baroclinic Models of the Atmosphere". Monthly Weather Review. 100 (5): 329–335. Bibcode:1972MWRv..100..329R. doi:10.1175/1520-0493(1972)100<0329:AITISF>2.3.CO;2.
- Robert, André (1971). Merilees, Philip Errol (ed.). Truncation errors in a filtered barotropic model. Proceedings of the (ninth) Stanstead Seminar : held at MacDonald College Campus, McGill University, Ste-Anne-de-Bellevue, Quebec, Canada, July 12–16, 1971. Publication in meteorology. Vol. 103. Department of Meteorology, McGill University. pp. 13–28. OCLC 2529697.
- Kwizak, M. and A. Robert, 1971: A semi-implicit scheme for grid point atmospheric models of the primitive equations. Monthly Weather Review, Vol. 99, No. 1, pp. 32–36.
- Robert, A., F.G. Shuman and J.P. Gerrity, 1970: On partial difference equations in mathematical physics. Monthly Weather Review, Vol. 98, No. 1, pp. 1–6.
- Robert, A., 1969: An unstable solution to the problem of advection by the finite-difference Eulerian method. Office Note No. 30, National Meteorological Center, Washington, D.C.
- Robert, A., 1969: Forecast experiments with a spectral model. Proceedings of Seminars on the middle-atmosphere. Stanstead, Québec. Department of Meteorology, McGill University, pp. 69–82.
- Robert, A., 1968: Résultats de quelques applications récentes de la méthode spectrale. La Météorologie. Paris, France. pp. 453–469.
- Robert, A., 1968: The treatment of moisture and precipitation in atmospheric models integrated by the spectral method. Journal of Applied Meteorology. Vol. 7, pp. 730–735.
- Robert, A., 1968: The integration of a spectral model of the atmosphere by the implicit method. Proceedings of the International Symposium on Numerical Weather Prediction. Tokyo. pp. 19–25.
- Robert, A., 1968: Integration of a spectral barotropic model from global 500-mb charts. Monthly Weather Review, Vol. 96, pp. 83–85.
- Robert, A., 1967: The incorporation of precipitation into a spectral model of the atmosphere. Proceedings of the Seminar on the middle-atmosphere. Stanstead, Québec. Department of Meteorology, McGill University, pp. 91–114.
- Robert, A., 1966: The integration of a low order spectral form of the primitive meteorological equations. Journal of the Meteorological Society of Japan. Vol. 44, pp. 237–245.
- Robert, A., 1965: The integration of the spectral form of the primitive equations. Proceedings of the Symposium on the dynamics of large-scale atmospheric processes. Academy of Sciences of the U.S.S.R., Moscow, pp. 66–69.
- Robert, A., 1965: The behaviour of planetary waves in an atmospheric model based on spherical harmonics. McGill University. Publication in Meteorology No. 77.
- Robert, A., 1963: A baroclinic model for the Canadian numerical weather prediction program. Seminars on the Stratosphere and Mesosphere and Polar Meteorology. Stanstead, Québec. Department of Meteorology, McGill University, pp. 83–88.
- Robert, A., 1963: Baroclinic experiments with a four-level statistical dynamical model. Meteorological Memoir No. 15.
- Robert, A. and M. Kwizak, 1963: An evaluation of simple non-geostrophic forecasts. Meteorological Memoirs No. 13.
