= Patterson Medal =

Award from the Meteorological Service of Canada

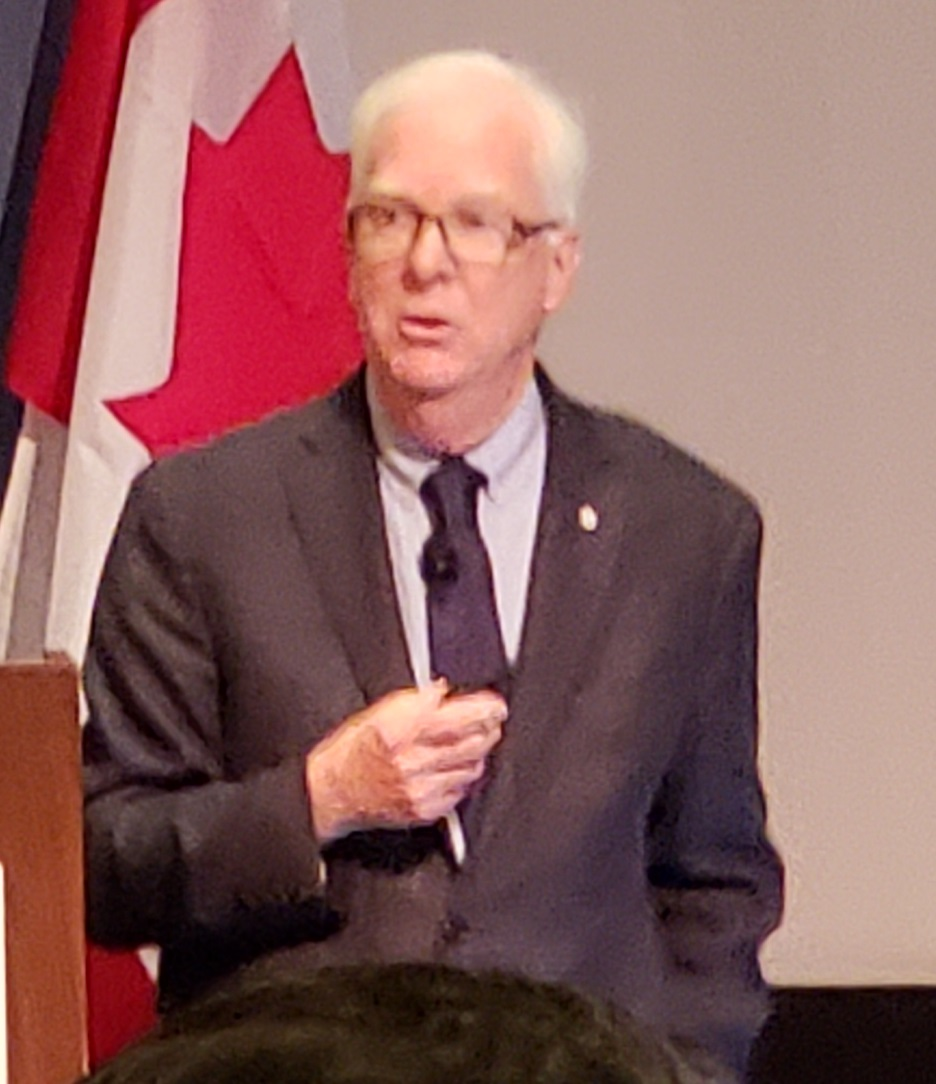
1993 winner, David Phillips

The Patterson Distinguished Service Medal is awarded by the Meteorological Service of Canada (MSC) to residents of Canada for services rendered to meteorology. The award was created in honour of Mr. John Patterson, a meteorologist who served as director and controller of the MSC from 1929 to 1946, an important period in his development.

The Patterson Medal was awarded for the first time in 1954 to its namesake after enough funds have been collected. It is considered the most important award for the recognition of exceptional work done in meteorology by Canadians. This is not a distinction of the Canadian Meteorological and Oceanographic Society (CMOS), but it is customary to announce its award during the CMOS Congress.

== Winners ==
The medal was presented to John Patterson in 1954. Due to lack of funds, a 7-year hiatus occurred before the next attribution in 1961 when the MSC committed to fund the award. Since then, it has been awarded annually. The winners are:

- 2025 Parissa Ariya, David Sills
- 2024 James Whiteway
- 2023 Kent Moore
- 2022 Peter Yau
- 2021 Kimberly Strong
- 2020 David Grimes
- 2019 Paul Kushner
- 2018 Michel Jean
- 2017 William (Bill) Appleby
- 2016 René Laprise
- 2015 Charles Thomas McElroy
- 2014 Ronald E. Stewart
- 2013 William W. Hsieh
- 2012 Barry Goodison, John Wilson
- 2011 John Gyakum
- 2010 Gilbert Brunet
- 2009 Bruce Angle
- 2008 George A. Isaac
- 2007 Francis Zwiers & John C McConnell
- 2006 George Boer & John Falkingham
- 2005 Michel Béland
- 2004 Ian D. Rutherford & Theodore G. Shepherd
- 2003 C. Harold Ritchie
- 2002 Timothy R. Oke
- 2001 James D. Abraham
- 2000 Edward P. Lozowski
- 1999 James R. Drummond & Peter H. Schuepp
- 1998 Peter Taylor
- 1997 Nancy B. Cutler & Lawrence A. Mysak
- 1996 Norman A. McFarlane
- 1995 Jacques Derome & Desmond O’Neill
- 1994 Philip Merilees
- 1993 David Phillips
- 1992 George W. Thurtell
- 1991 R.W. (Dick) Peltier & Isztar Zawadzki
- 1990 George W. Robertson
- 1989 Gordon A. McBean
- 1988 Keith Hage
- 1987 Gordon A. McKay & Douglas M. Whelpdale
- 1986 James P. Bruce
- 1985 André Robert
- 1984 Byron W. Boville
- 1983 John L. Knox & W.E. (Bill) Markham
- 1982 Svenn Orvig
- 1981 Laurence T. Campbell
- 1980 Morley K. Thomas
- 1979 W.E. Knowles Middleton
- 1978 Roland List
- 1977 Walter F. Hitschfeld
- 1976 J. Reginald H. Noble
- 1975 Wolfgang Baier
- 1974 Robert W. Stewart
- 1973 F. Kenneth Hare
- 1972 Robert Edward Munn
- 1971 Alan W. Brewer
- 1970 Donald C. Archibald & Jay Scott Dickson
- 1969 G. Oscar Villeneuve
- 1968 Warren L. Godson
- 1967 Balfour W. Currie
- 1966 Clarence C. Boughner
- 1965 Donald G. Black & James M. Leaver
- 1964 Andrew Thomson & Patrick D. McTaggart-Cowan
- 1963 Desmond B. Kennedy
- 1962 Reuben A. Hornstein
- 1961 Arthur J. Childs & J. Stewart Marshall
- 1954 John Patterson

== See also ==
- List of meteorology awards
