= David Phillips (climatologist) =

Canadian climatologist (b. 1944)

David Phillips CM
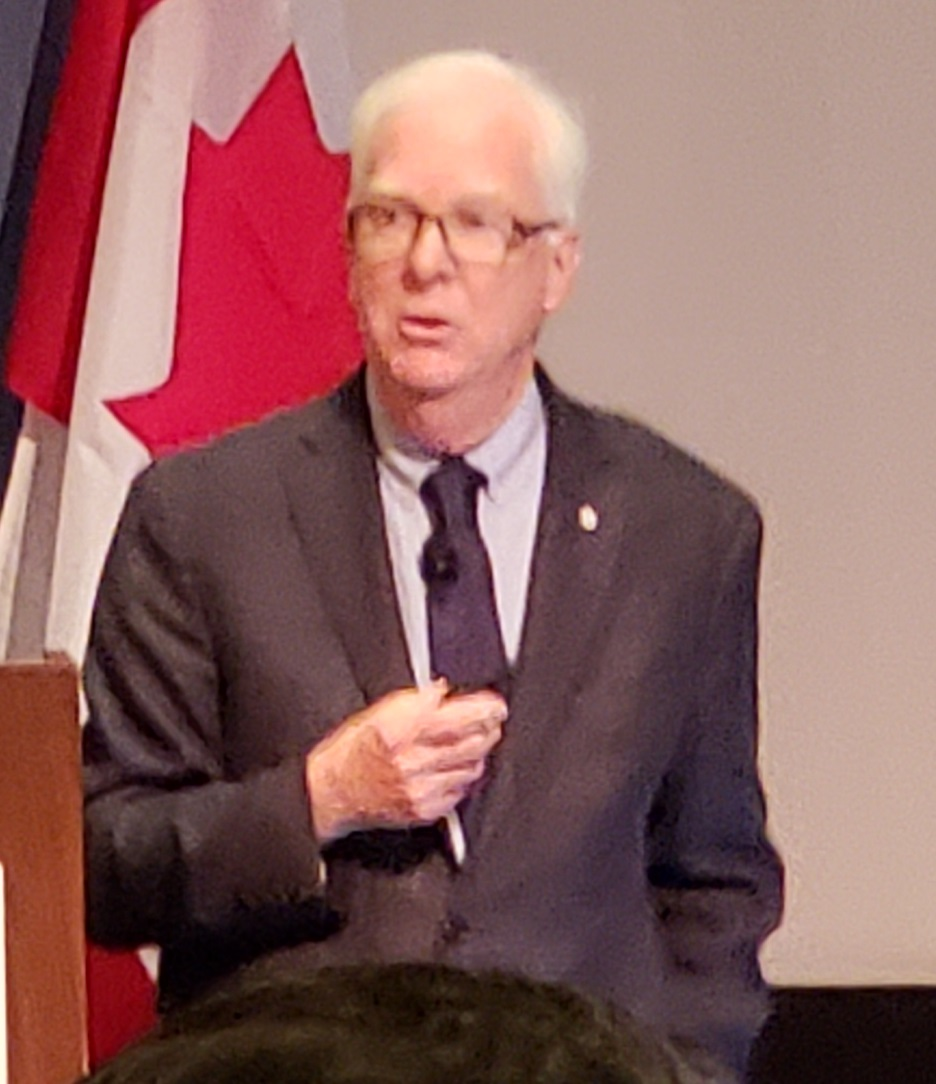
- Born: David Wayne Phillips; September 8, 1944 (age 82); Windsor, Ontario, Canada
- Education: University of Windsor (BA)
- Awards: Patterson Medal; Queen Elizabeth II Diamond Jubilee Medal
- Scientific career
- Fields: Climatology
- Workplaces: Meteorological Service of Canada

David Wayne Phillips, CM (born 8 September 1944) is a climatologist who worked for the Meteorological Service of Canada at Environment Canada from 1967 to 2024.

== Early life and education ==
Phillips was born and raised in Windsor, Ontario, studied geography at the University of Windsor, graduating in 1967 with a BA.

== Career ==
Phillips taught high school for a short time. He was then hired by the Meteorological Branch of Transport Canada in 1967 to conduct research on the Great Lakes in Toronto. The work involved using climatological data to answer questions about climatic records: farmers asking for frost-free seasons or temperature trends, urban planners assessing the location for an airport or about the climatology of the wind for tall-buildings and more general public queries.

In the 1990s Phillips was filmed by the Weather Network, which created a series of 90-second trivia shorts about various weather topics entitled "Ask the Expert".

Phillips studies climate and promotes awareness and understanding of weather and climate in Canada. As a weather historian he has collected and catalogued more than 35,000 weather stories. Each year since 1996 he has compiled a list and description of the year's most interesting weather stories.

For nearly a decade he wrote the Weather-wise column in Canadian Geographic magazine. Each year he creates a calendar based on weather trivia.

In September 2024, Phillips retired from Environment Canada after a 57-year career in the federal public service, but still continues to work under emeritus status. As of 2025, Phillips continues to make frequent appearances on national radio and television including CP24, as a commentator on weather and climate matters.

== Awards ==
- Alumni Award of Merit from the University of Windsor (2012)
- Fellow of the Royal Canadian Geographical Society
- Fellow of the Canadian Meteorological and Oceanographic Society
- Commemorative Medal for the 125th Anniversary of the Confederation of Canada
- Patterson Medal for Distinguished Service to Meteorology in Canada
- Queen Elizabeth II Diamond Jubilee Medal
- Twice the Public Service Merit Award
- Honorary doctorates from the University of Waterloo and Nipissing University
- Order of Canada (2001)
- Camsell Medal by the Royal Canadian Geographical Society (1993)

== Publications ==
Phillips has authored several books, The Climates Of Canada and two bestsellers The Day Niagara Falls Ran Dry and Blame It On The Weather. Phillips published several essays in The Canadian Encyclopedia. He is also the author of The Canadian Weather Trivia Calendar. Among his work is the Climatic Severity Index, a ranking of 150 locations in Canada for their most extreme weather.
