= Lucy Campbell (mathematician) =

Applied mathematician and numerical analyst

Lucy Jean Campbell is an applied mathematician and numerical analyst from Barbados, Jamaica, Ghana, and Canada, specializing in the applications of fluid dynamics to modeling the Earth's atmosphere and oceans. Beyond fluid dynamics, she has also investigated methods for tracing the sources of greenhouse gas emissions. She is an associate professor in the School of Mathematics and Statistics at Carleton University.

== Early life and education ==
Campbell was born in Barbados. Her father, Merville O'Neale Campbell, was a mathematician at the University of the West Indies and was the first person from Barbados to earn a doctorate in mathematics. Her mother, a teacher, was from Ghana, where her father had taught prior to his 1964 return to Barbados. In 1967, the family moved to another campus of the University of the West Indies in Jamaica, where Campbell grew up. She writes that she always wanted to become an educator, aiming more specifically for mathematics after finding it to be her best subject already as a preschooler.

Campbell did her undergraduate studies in mathematics at the Kwame Nkrumah University of Science and Technology in Ghana, graduating with first class honours. After additional study at the University of Cambridge, she moved to McGill University in Canada, where she worked with Sherwin Maslowe. She earned a master's degree at McGill in 1996, with a master's thesis on Forced Rossby Wave Packets in a Zonal Shear Flow in the Presence of Critical Layers. In 2000 she completed her Ph.D. there. Her dissertation was Nonlinear Critical Layer Development of Forced Wave Packets in Geophysical Shear Flows.

== Later career ==
After completing her doctorate, Campbell did postdoctoral research in atmospheric physics at the University of Toronto, working with Ted Shepherd. She joined the Carleton faculty in 2003.

== Recognition ==
In 2019, the Canadian Applied and Industrial Mathematics Society gave Campbell their Arthur Beaumont Distinguished Service Award, in recognition of her service as an organizer of fluid dynamics meetings and as an officer of the society.
