= Recherche en Prévision Numérique =

Research office of the Canadian Meteorological Centre

The Recherche en Prévision Numérique center (RPN) is responsible for the research and development of the modelling component of the Numerical Weather Prediction (NWP) System for the Canadian Meteorological Centre (CMC) and the Regional Meteorological Centers of the Meteorological Service of Canada (MSC), Environment Canada (EC). Their work continues to underpin the operational MSC forecast systems.

The roots of RPN can be traced back to 1959, when the Dynamic Prediction Research (DPR) unit was established in Montréal. Over time, DPR was renamed RPN, and the CAO, with which RPN has always been co-located, evolved into the CMC.

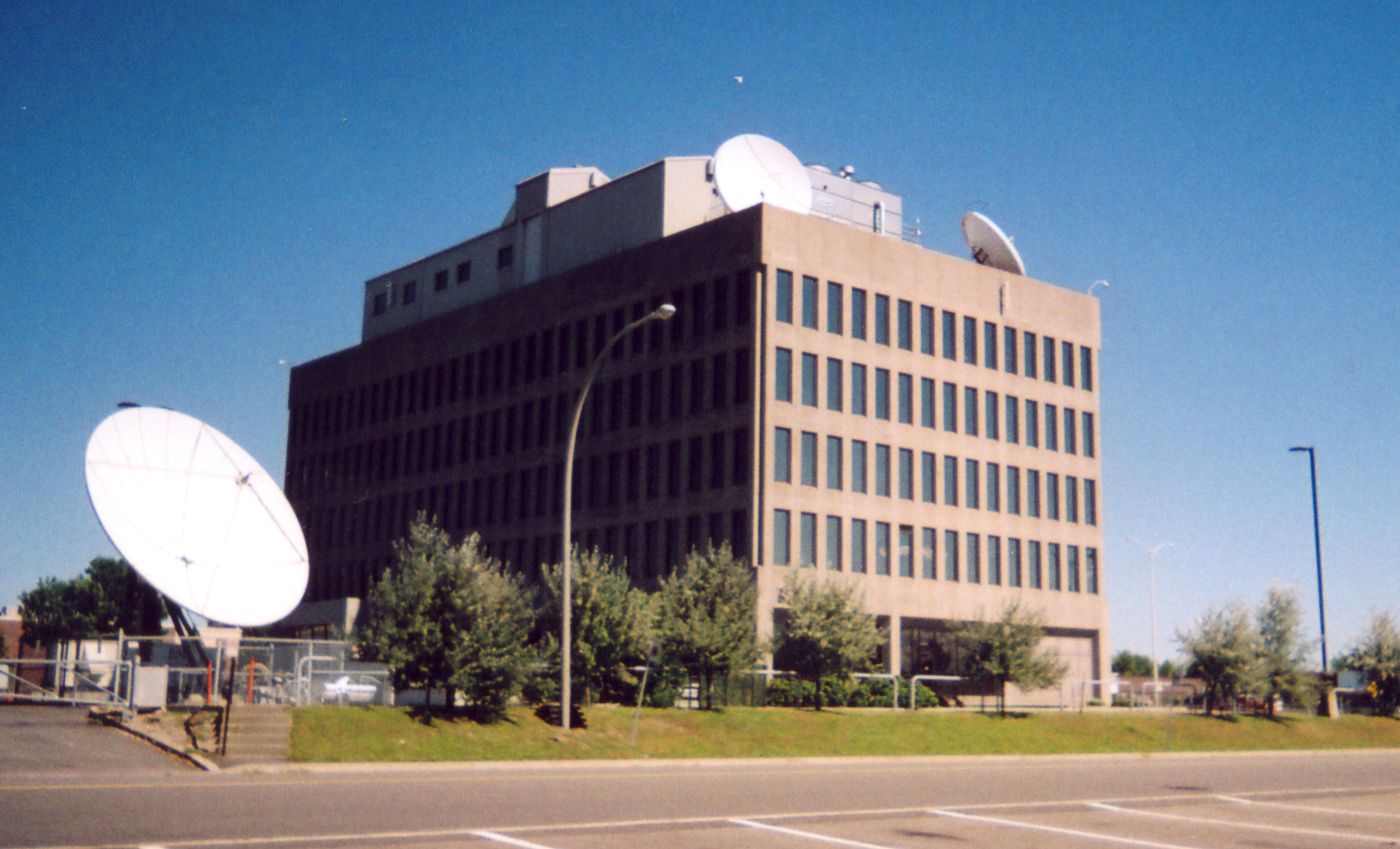
Canadian Metetorological Center in Dorval

The evolution of weather forecasting in Canada has transformed dramatically from manual, chart-based forecasting to an automated process powered by advanced computer models. This transformation was largely driven by the continual development of the Canadian NWP suite and the contributions of RPN scientists. These scientists were at the forefront of numerous NWP innovations, such as the integration of semi-Lagrangian schemes in the 1980s, which played a key role in advancing computational weather prediction.
