= Balfour Currie =

Canadian scientist (1902–1981)

Balfour Watson Currie
- Born: November 1, 1902; Helena, Montana
- Died: January 8, 1981 (aged 78); Saskatoon, Saskatchewan, Canada
- Awards: Order of Canada
- Scientific career
- Fields: meteorology and climatology
- Institutions: University of Saskatchewan
- Thesis: Adsorption of ions at a water surface (1930)

Balfour Watson Currie, CC FRSC (November 1, 1902 – January 8, 1981) was a Canadian scientist specializing in the fields of meteorology and climatology.

== Early life ==
Born in Montana, he came to Saskatchewan at an early age. His parents moved to a farm homestead at Netherhill, near Kindersley, in the west central region of the province. Because of his pioneer heritage, he was equally comfortable with internationally renowned scientists or with farmers in the field. He came to the University of Saskatchewan as a student and received a Bachelor-level degree in physics (1925) and a Master-level degree in physics (1927). His Ph.D. program at McGill University was completed in 1930.

== Career ==
He was a staff member of the Department of Physics at the University of Saskatchewan (1928 - 1981), was Professor of Physics (1943–70) Head of the Department (1952–61), founder of the Institute of Space and Atmospheric Studies (1956–66), Dean of Graduate Studies (1959–70) and vice-president, Research (1967–74). Upon his retirement as vice-president, he was appointed by the President of the university to be Special Advisor in Research Matters (1974–78). Later in 1974, he became Canadian Coordinator of the International Magnetospheric Study, and gave it his fullest attention until its completion at the end of 1979. During this period, he also pursued an earlier research interest in the possible influence of solar activity on prairie weather and rainfall.

Early in his career, he spent two years in the Canadian Arctic. Currie and Frank Davies worked together at Chesterfield Inlet during the Second International Polar Year (1932–1933). An online archive of Currie's work on 2nd IPY studies of the Polar Year data continued under his direction at the University of Saskatchewan after World War II.

== Recognition ==
In recognition of his outstanding contributions to his fields of study, he was elected a Fellow of the Royal Meteorology Society of Great Britain in 1940, and a Fellow of the Royal Society of Canada in 1947. In 1967, he received the Patterson Medal from the Canadian Meteorological and Oceanographic Society. In 1972, he was made a Companion of the Order of Canada "for his services to science and education, especially in the fields of meteorology and climatology".

In 1977, he received an honorary Doctor of Science (space research) from York University.

The University of Saskatchewan annually awards the prestigious Balfour Currie Memorial Scholarship, established by the Department of Physics and Engineering Physics in honour of Balfour Currie.

== Selected publications ==
- BW Currie, (1939) Earth Currents, Journal of the Royal Astronomical Society of Canada, Vol. 33, p. 313 scanned PDF
- WD Penn and BW Currie (1949) A recording meter for auroral radiations, Canadian Journal of Research, Vol. 27A biblio. record
- WG Kendrew, BW Currie (1955) The Climate of Central Canada (book) E. Cloutier, Queen's Printer
- BW Currie, (1955) Auroral Heights over Central-Western Canada, Canadian Journal of Physics 33(12): 773–779
