= Tiffany Shaw =

Canadian geophysical scientist

Tiffany A. Shaw
- Born: Brampton, Ontario, Canada
- Education: University of British Columbia, University of Toronto (M.S. and Ph.D)
- Awards: NSF CAREER Award, American Geophysical Union James B. Macelwane Medal
- Scientific career
- Fields: Geophysical science; Atmospheric science
- Thesis: Energy and Momentum Consistency in Subgrid-Scale Parameterization for Climate Models
- Doctoral advisor: Ted Shepherd

Tiffany Shaw is a geophysical scientist from Canada. She is currently a professor at the University of Chicago. She is known for her extensive contributions to the geophysical and atmospheric sciences.

== Early life and education ==
Tiffany Shaw is a geophysical scientist from Brampton, Canada. Her interest in science and math stemmed from an influential math teacher she had in high school. Her specific interest in geophysical and atmospheric sciences began while she was studying to become a pilot.

She received her B.S. in Atmospheric Science and Math at the University of British Columbia in 2004. In 2005, she completed her M.S. in physics from the University of Toronto. In 2009, Shaw received her PhD in physics from the University of Toronto. There, she worked with her mentor and advisor, Ted Shepherd on her doctoral thesis: Energy and Momentum Consistency in Subgrid-Scale Parameterization for Climate Models.

== Career and research ==
From 2009 to 2010, Shaw worked as a research assistant professor at the Center for Atmospheric Ocean Science at the Courant Institute at New York University. Shaw then worked as a Natural Sciences and Engineering Research Council of Canada Post Doctoral Fellow at the Lamont–Doherty Earth Observatory & Department of Applied Physics and Applied Mathematics at Columbia University from 2010 to 2011. From 2011 to 2015, Shaw worked as an assistant professor of earth and environmental sciences & applied physics and applied mathematics at Columbia University.

In 2015, Shaw began her work at the University of Chicago. From 2015 to 2017, Shaw was an assistant professor of the geophysical sciences, and became an associate professor of the geophysical sciences in 2017. In 2022 she became a professor of the geophysical sciences.

Shaw is known for her research in the geophysical sciences and atmospheric sciences, and most of her research pertains to how climate change affects these sciences.

In 2004, Shaw and her advisor, Ted Shepherd, wrote the paper The angular momentum constraint on climate sensitivity and downward influence in the middle atmosphere, which asserts that the friction between atmospheric layers needs to be represented in calculations about the effects of climate change. In 2010, Shaw wrote a paper entitled Downward wave coupling between stratosphere and troposphere: The important of meridional wave guiding and comparison with zonal-mean coupling. In 2017, Shaw worked on the paper Moist static energy framework for zonal-mean storm-track intensity. This paper showed that seasonal strength cannot be explained solely by seasonal changes in solar radiation, and that surface heat fluxes account for the muted seasonality in the Southern Hemisphere and large seasonality in the Northern Hemisphere, and in response to climate change surface heat fluxes over ocean versus land exert opposing influences on the strength of storm tracks. Shaw wrote Circulation response to warming shaped by radiative changes of clouds and water vapor (2015), which outlines how the atmosphere will manifest global climate change thru clouds and water vapor. Another well known paper by Shaw is Storm track processes and the opposing influences of climate change (2016), which is about how changing temperature gradients are altering storm track processes.

== Awards and honors ==
In 2013, Shaw received the NSF CAREER award for her work as a teacher, researcher, and scholar. In her physics research, Shaw focused on the variability of transportation of moisture in the summertime, and its effect on monsoons and subtropical anticyclones. In 2015, Shaw received the Alfred P. Sloan Research Fellowship in Physics. In 2017, Shaw won the American Geophysical Union James B. Macelwane Medal for her important contributions to the geophysical sciences.

== Publications ==
- M. J. Alexander, et al. (15 co-authors including T. A. Shaw), 2010: Recent developments in gravity wave effects in climate models and the global distribution of gravity wave momentum flux from observations and models. Q. J. Roy. Meteor. Soc., 136, 1103–1124.
- Simpson, I., T. A. Shaw, and R. Seager, 2014: A diagnosis of the seasonally and longitudinally varying mid-latitude circulation response to global warming. J. Atmos. Sci., 71, 2489–2515.
- Shaw, T. A., M. Baldwin, E. A. Barnes, R. Caballero, C. I. Garfinkel, Y-T. Hwang, C. Li, P. A. O'Gorman, G. Riviere, I R. Simpson, and A. Voigt, 2016: Storm track processes and the opposing influences of climate change, Nature Geosc., 10.1038/ngeo2783.
- Shaw, T. A., J. Perlwitz, and N. Harnik, 2010: Downward wave coupling between the stratosphere and troposphere: The importance of meridional wave guiding and comparison with zonal-mean coupling. J. Climate, 23, 6365–6381.
