= Isztar Zawadzki =

Argentinian, Canadian and Polish meteorologist

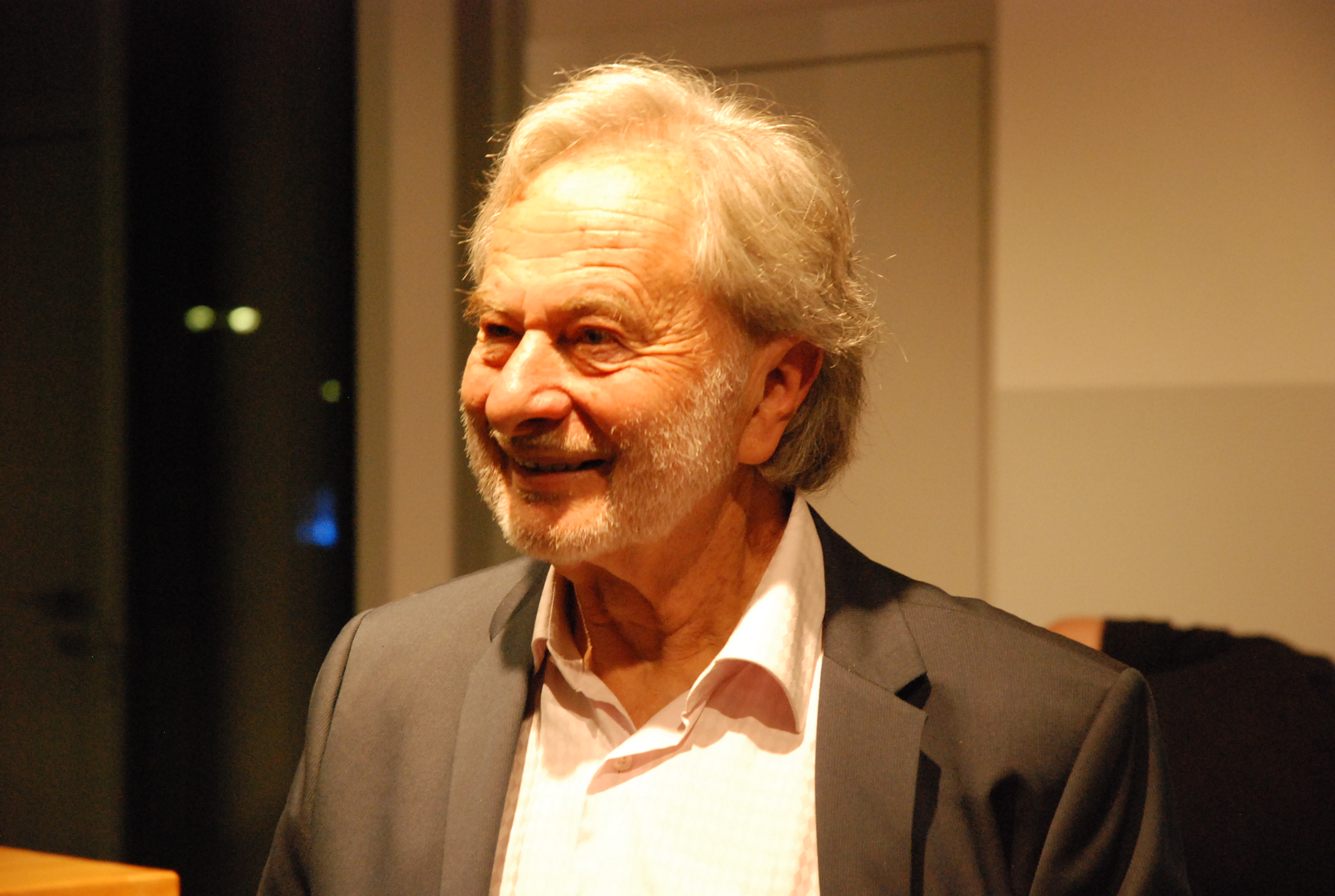
- Born: 9 February 1939; Warsaw (Poland)
- Died: 11 February 2023 (aged 84); Montreal (Canada)
- Alma mater: University of Buenos Aires; McGill University
- Occupation: Physicist; meteorologist; professor
- Employer: McGill University
- Awards: Patterson Medal (1991)

Isztar Zawadzki (February 9, 1939 - February 11, 2023) was a Canadian meteorologist, born in Poland and raised in Argentina. Professor at the McGill Atmospheric and Oceanic Sciences department in Montreal, Québec, he specialized in radar meteorology, a field where he has made important contributions.

== Biography ==
Zawadzki was born in Warsaw, Poland on February 9, 1939, just before the outbreak of World War II. Fleeing anti-Semitism and war, his mother took refuge with him in the USSR, then in Argentina. It was in this country that he received a degree in physics from the University of Buenos Aires in 1963. He then specialized in radar meteorology by completing a master's degree (M.Sc. 1968) and a doctorate (PhD. 1972) at McGill University in Montreal.

After his studies, he was first a professor at the Université du Québec à Montréal (UQÀM) during the 1970s where he became director of studies in atmospheric sciences from 1971 to 1982, then director of the physics department. from 1988 to 1992. He then became a professor at McGill University until the end of the 2000s. At this university, he served as the director of the J. S. Marshall Radar Observatory, where he supervised several students who published important papers.

Zawadzki retired in 2010 but continued to serve as professor emeritus. He specializes in weather radar, cloud physics and nowcasting. He died at age 84 on February 11, 2023, after suffering a second cerebrovascular accident (CVA).

== Awards and honors ==
Isztar Zawadzki is the author or co-author of more than 117 articles covering a wide range of applications of weather radar data and cloud physics, including improving understanding of the formation processes and distribution of precipitation during winter and summer such as the growth of drops, icing of snowflakes, etc...

At the national and international level, Zawadzki was director of the Cooperative Research Center in Mesometeorology (McGill-UQAM-MSC) and senior scientist of the Canadian Meteorological Research Program (Environment and Climate Change Canada). Doctor Zawadzki received:

- 1991, Patterson Medal for outstanding contribution to meteorology in Canada,
- 1998 Canadian Meteorological and Oceanographic Society President's Award,
- 2001, Fellow of the Canadian Meteorological and Oceanographic Society,
- 2004, Fellow of the American Meteorological Society (AMS),
- 2007, Remote Sensing Prize of the AMS,
- 2007, member of the Royal Society of Canada.
