= John Patterson (meteorologist) =

Canadian physicist and meteorologist (1872–1956)

- Born: January 3, 1872; Oxford County, Ontario
- Died: February 22, 1956 (aged 84); Clarkson Township, Ontario
- Education: B.A., M.A.
- Alma mater: University of Toronto; Cambridge University
- Occupations: Physicist, meteorologist
- Spouse: Margaret Norris
- Children: Arthur Patterson
- Parent(s): Francis Patterson; Annie Telfer

John Patterson OBE, (January 3, 1872 – February 22, 1956) was a Canadian physicist and meteorologist.

Born on a farm in Oxford County, Ontario, he was one of thirteen children of Francis Patterson and Annie (Telfer). He matriculated to the University of Toronto, graduating in 1900 with a B.A. in engineering, and was awarded a 1851 Exhibition Science Research Scholarship to study physics for his M.A. at the Cavendish Laboratory, University of Cambridge. There he performed studies of thin metallic films and their electrical properties, ionization of the air, and the variation of electrical resistance of metals when exposed to magnetic fields.

Patterson travelled to India in 1903 where he served as professor of physics at the University of Allahabad, until in January 1905 he was named imperial meteorologist to the Government of India at Simla. On January 1, 1906, he was married to Margaret Norris, a medical practitioner and professor of obstetrics working in India. The couple had two children, one of whom died in India. With John suffering from ill health, the couple left for Toronto with their son Arthur in 1910.

He became a physicist for the Canadian Meteorological Service, where he was responsible for organizing a pilot program for performing upper air observations using balloons. In 1912 he was placed in charge of the newly formed department of physics at the Central Office in Toronto. During the First World War, he worked for the British Admiralty to perform an experiment in extracting helium from natural gas. Following the war, he was involved in designing a new barometer and was responsible for developing the 3-cup anemometer now in widespread use. In 1925 he became assistant director of the Meteorological service, then in 1929 he was named director (controller), succeeding the retiring Sir Frederic Stupart. Patterson held this post until his retirement in 1946. He was elected to serve as president of the American Meteorological Society during 1930–31 and president of the Royal Canadian Institute in 1932–33.

In 1954, the Patterson Distinguished Service Medal was created in his honour and attributed to him.

== Bibliography ==
- A meteorological trip to the Arctic Circle (1915)
- Upper air investigation in Canada: observations by registering balloons (1915)
- Pilot-balloon work in Canada (1920)
- The cup anemometer (1926)
- Airship meteorology (1931)
- Canada's program for the International Polar Year 1932-33 (1932)
- The development of meteorological science (1933)
- Meteorological services for Trans-Canada Airways (1939)
- Weather services for Canada's airways (1939)
- A century of Canadian meteorology (1940)
- Sir Frederic Stupart (1941)
- Meteorology related to the science of aviation (1944)
- Meteorology in peace and war (1949)
- Meteorology (1949)
