= Toronto Magnetic and Meteorological Observatory =

Observatory at the University of Toronto St. George

Coordinates: 43°39′47.47″N 79°23′40.6″W

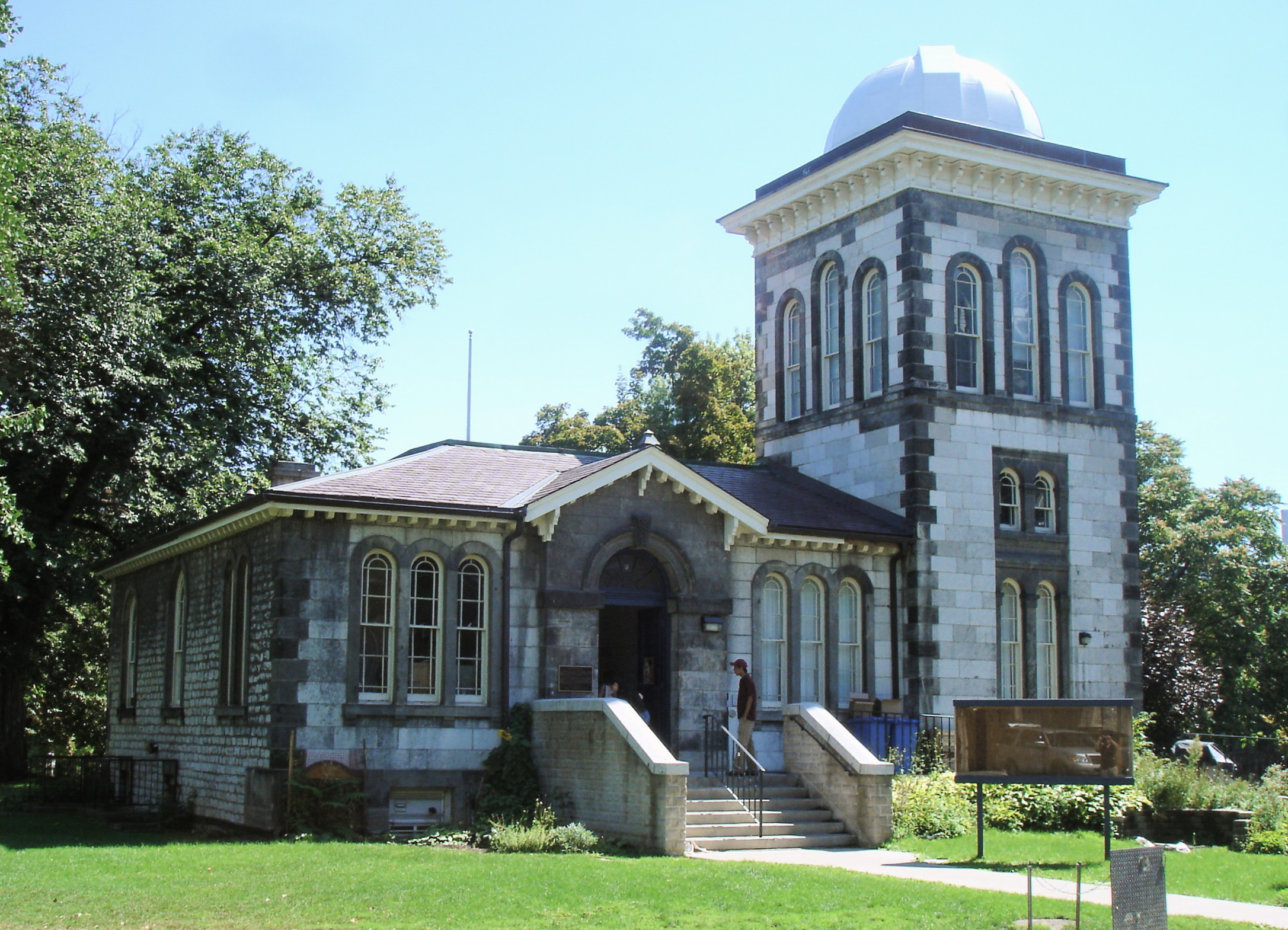
The Toronto Magnetic and Meteorological Observatory on the St. George campus of the University of Toronto

The Toronto Magnetic and Meteorological Observatory, formally the Louis B. Stewart Observatory, is a historical observatory located on the St. George campus of the University of Toronto, in Toronto, Ontario, Canada. The original log building was constructed in 1840 as part of a worldwide research project run by Edward Sabine to determine the cause of fluctuations in magnetic declination. Measurements from the Toronto site demonstrated that sunspots were responsible for this effect on Earth's magnetic field. When this project concluded in 1853, the observatory was rebuilt in stone by the Canadian government and served as the country's primary meteorological station and official timekeeper for over fifty years. The observatory is considered the birthplace of Canadian astronomy.

== Sabine's study ==
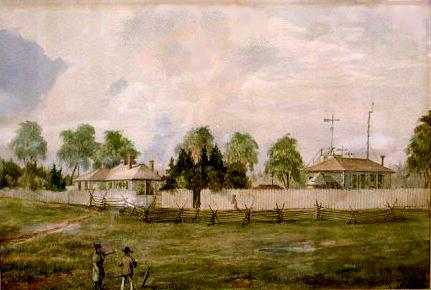
The original observatory: the main building is on the right, with the dome visible, and the roof of the smaller buried building is just visible over the fence. Painted by William Armstrong in 1852.

Compasses tended to "wander" from north when measurements were taken at different locations or even at a single location over a period of time. The astronomer Edmund Halley noted this and the problems it would cause for navigation in 1701. It was also believed that whatever was causing this effect might be causing changes in the weather, and that studying magnetic variations might lead to better weather prediction.

In 1833 the British Association for the Advancement of Science commissioned a series of magnetic measurements across the United Kingdom. Under the direction of Major Edward Sabine of the Royal Artillery, a multi-year measuring project began, with the results to be published in 1838. As the measurements were being made a number of proposals were put forth to expand the program worldwide. In 1836 the German explorer and naturalist Alexander von Humboldt wrote to Prince Augustus Frederick, Duke of Sussex, then President of the Royal Society, stating that a formal program was important to a nation with dominions spread across the globe. At the seventh meeting of the British Association in Liverpool in 1837, Sabine declared that "the magnetism of the earth cannot be counted less than one of the most important branches of the physical history of the planet we inhabit" and mapping its variations would be "regarded by our contemporaries and by posterity as a fitting enterprise of a maritime people; and a worthy achievement of a nation which has ever sought to rank foremost in every arduous undertaking".

In 1837, the British Government funded the installation of a magnetic observatory at Greenwich. The Association continued to press for the construction of similar observatories around the world, and in 1838 their suggestions were accepted by the Government and funds were provided. In 1839 the British Government and the Royal Society prepared four expeditions to build magnetic observation stations in Cape Town; St. Helena; Hobart, Tasmania and (eventually) Toronto, Ontario. Teams of Royal Artillery officers were sent out to take the measurements. The team assigned to Canada originally planned to build their observatory on Saint Helen's Island off Montreal, but the local rocks proved to have a high magnetic influence, and the decision was made to move to Toronto instead. The team arrived in 1839, and set up camp at Fort York in a disused barracks while construction started on new buildings. The observatory was given 10 acres (4.0 ha) of land to the west of King's College; the Ontario Legislature now occupies the area on which the college was located.

The observatory, officially "Her Majesty's Magnetical and Meteorological Observatory at Toronto", was completed the following year. It consisted of two log buildings, one for the magnetic instruments and the other a smaller semi-buried building nearby for "experimental determinations". The north end of the main building was connected to a small conical dome which contained a theodolite used to make astronomical measurements for the accurate determination of the local time. The buildings were constructed with as little metal as possible; when metal was required, non-magnetic materials such as brass or copper were used. A small barracks was built nearby to house the crew.

Using the measurements from the Toronto and Hobart sites, Sabine noticed both short-term fluctuations in magnetic declination over a period of hours, and longer-term variations over months. He quickly concluded that the short term variations were due to the day/night cycle, while the longer term ones were due to the number of visible sunspots. He published two introductory papers on the topic in the Philosophical Transactions of the Royal Society. The first, in 1851, was a collection of early measurements; the second in 1852 correlated with Heinrich Schwabe's sunspot measurements, which had been made widely available in Alexander von Humboldt's Cosmos, also published in 1851. With further data collected from the Toronto site, Sabine was able to demonstrate conclusively that the eleven-year sunspot cycle caused a similarly periodic variation in the Earth's magnetic field. He presented a third and conclusive paper on the topic in 1856, "On Periodical Laws Discoverable in the Mean Effects of the Larger Magnetic Disturbances", in which he singled out the Toronto site for particular praise.

Sir John Henry Lefroy, a pioneer in the study of terrestrial magnetism served as director of the magnetic observatory from 1842 to 1853; In 1960, the Ontario Heritage Foundation, Ministry of Citizenship and Culture erected a Provincial Military Plaque in his honour on the St. George campus.

== Meteorological service ==
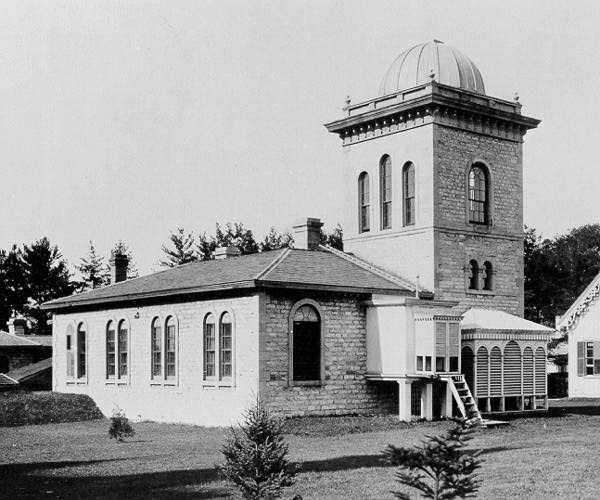
The newer observatory before it was moved, looking towards the southwest. This image is the same orientation as the one below, viewed from the left of the tower.

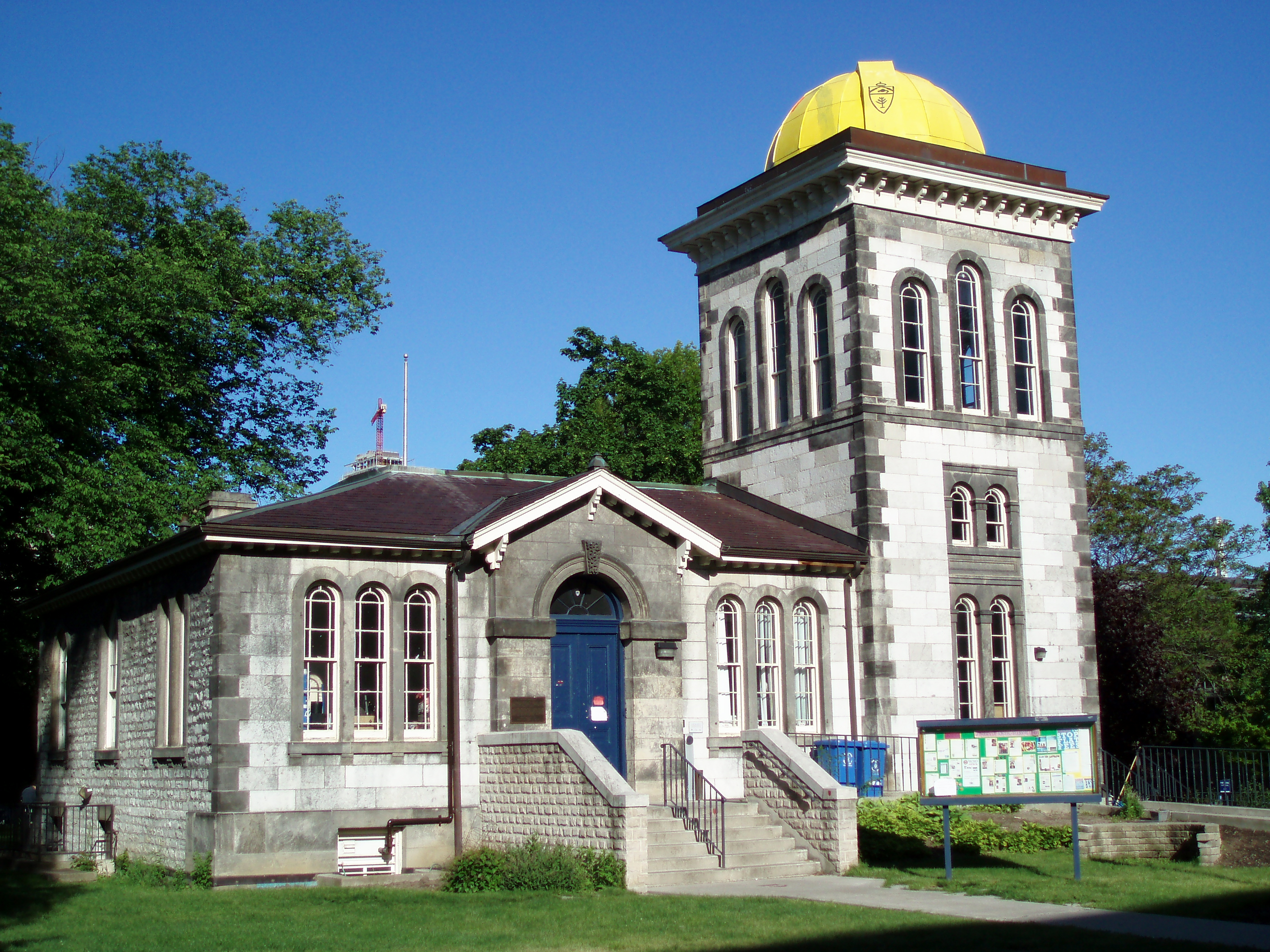
The observatory in 2009, looking east-southeast. Offices on the ground floor have been rotated; the entrance was formerly to the right of the tower.

In 1853 the Royal Society's project was concluded, and the observatory was set to be abandoned. After a lengthy debate, the fledgling colonial government decided to take over its operation. Rather than disappearing like its three counterparts, the Toronto observatory was upgraded, and its mission was expanded as it became a meteorological station (see Meteorological Service of Canada) under the direction of the Ministry of Marine and Fisheries. During the expansion, the original buildings were replaced with a permanent structure.

The new building was designed in 1853 by local architect Frederick Cumberland, who was also working on the design of University College, which was being built just north of the Observatory to replace King's College. The new observatory design called for a stone building, with an attached tower containing the transit theodolite. The new building was completed in 1855, and stood directly opposite the entrance of today's Convocation Hall.

During its time as a meteorological station, the observatory collected reports from 312 observation stations in Canada and another 36 in the United States. Each station was equipped with a "Mercurial Barometer, two Thermometers (a maximum and a minimum Thermometer), an Anemometer to measure the velocity of the wind, a Wind Vane and a Rain Gauge". Reports were sent in coded form to the Observatory at 8 am and 8 pm every day, Eastern Standard Time (then known as "75th meridian time"), and used to produce a chart predicting the weather for the following 36 hours. These predictions were then telegraphed across the country, and charts were distributed to newspapers and the Board of Trade, where they could be viewed by the public. With the installation of telephones, the Observatory also offered weather reports on demand, which was an important service to fruit vendors, who used the reports to plan shipping.

Among its other uses, in 1880, measurements from the site were used as part of the effort to develop standard time. The observatory remained the official timekeeper for Canada until 1905, when that responsibility was transferred to Ottawa's Dominion Observatory. At exactly 11:55 am the clocks in Toronto fire halls were rung by an electrical signal from the Observatory.

In 1881 the observatory's director, Charles Carpmeal, suggested adding a high-quality telescope to the observatory. He felt that direct solar observations would lead to a better understanding of sunspot effects on weather (as late as 1910 the observatory's then-director, Robert Frederic Stupart, noted that "sun spots have more to do with our weather conditions than have the rings around the moon."). Coincidentally, the Canadian government (having formed in 1867) was interested in taking part in the major international effort to accurately record the December 1882 Transit of Venus.

Funds were provided for the purchase of a 6-inch (150 mm) refracting telescope from T. Cooke & Sons. The dome was originally designed to mount a small transit, and the lengthy telescope, over 2 metres long, had a limited field of view though the dome's opening. A large stone pillar was constructed inside the tower, raising the telescope to bring it closer to the dome and improve its field of view. Unfortunately, the new telescope was unable to take part in the transit measurements due to bad weather, and missed the 1895 Transit of Mercury for the same reason.

== Relocation ==
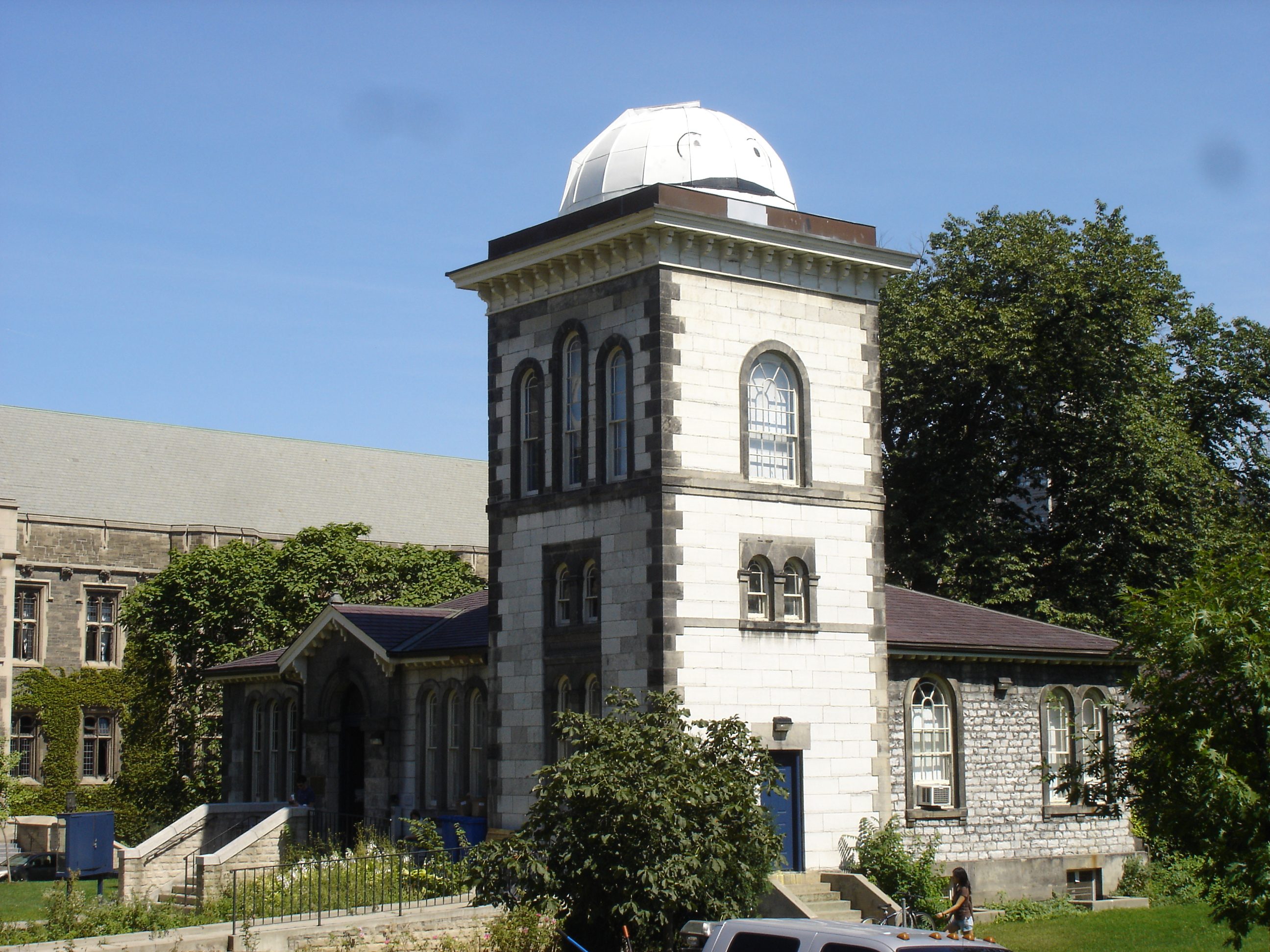
The observatory viewed looking north-northeast, with Hart House in the background. The rotation of the tower is more obvious here: compare the location of the windows with the images above.

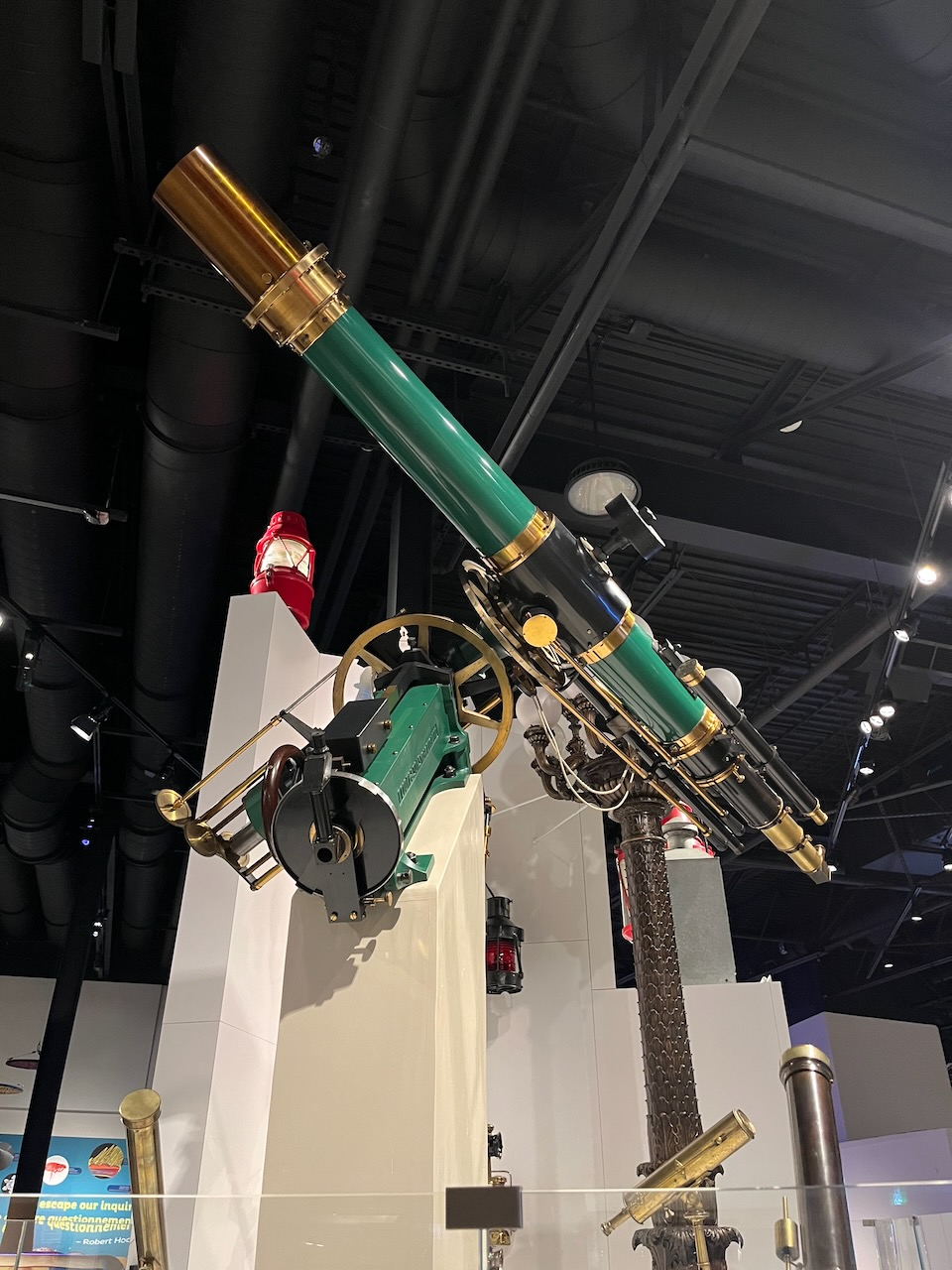
The Cooke telescope at its current location in the Canada Science and Technology Museum.

By the 1890s, the observatory had become crowded by the rapidly growing university. Electrification of the streetcar line along College Street just to the south, and the large quantities of metal used in the modern buildings surrounding the site threw off the instruments. A new magnetic observatory opened in 1898 in Agincourt, at that time largely empty fields, (found on later maps on the north end of George Forfar farm east of Midland Avenue near Highway 401 or where Health Canada Protection Branch building resides today) leaving the St. George campus location with its meteorological and solar observation duties.

By 1907, new university buildings completely surrounded the observatory; dust from the construction clogged meteorological instruments, and at night electric lighting made astronomical work impossible. The Meteorological Office decided to abandon the site and move to a new building at the north end of campus at 315 Bloor Street West, trading the original Observatory to the University in exchange for the new parcel of land. There was some discussion regarding what to do with the Cooke telescope, since the Meteorological Office had little use for this purely astronomical instrument. No other use was immediately forthcoming, and the telescope moved along with the Meteorological Office to their new Bloor Street Observatory.

The university assumed ownership of the now-disused observatory building and was originally going to abandon it. Louis Beaufort Stewart, a lecturer in the Faculty of Applied Science and Engineering, campaigned for it to be saved for the Department of Surveying and Geodesy. He eventually arranged for the building to be re-constructed on a more suitable site. Demolition work was carried out in 1907: the stones were simply left in place over the winter, and were used the following year to construct a re-arranged building just east of the main University College building (south of Hart House).

In 1930 the Meteorological Office no longer used the Cooke telescope, and agreed to donate it to the university if they would handle its removal. Both the telescope and the observatory dome were moved to the observatory building. The telescope moved once again in 1952 to the David Dunlap Observatory north of the city, and in 1984 it was donated to the Canada Science and Technology Museum. The Department of Surveying and Geodesy used the observatory until the 1950s. Since then the office areas have been used for a variety of purposes, including a police substation and a telephone switchboard. Renamed as the Louis Beaufort Stewart Observatory, the building was handed over to the Students' Administrative Council (now University of Toronto Students' Union) in 1953. The Students' Union moved to the Student Commons building at 230 College Street in 2021. The dome, now unused, receives a yearly multi-colour paint job by engineering students.

The Agincourt site would close in 1969 and demolished by 1971.

== Heritage ==
The property is listed on the City of Toronto's Heritage Register since 1973. The listing notes it was opened as an observatory in 1857, designed by Cumberland and Storm.

== See also ==
- University of Toronto Southern Observatory
- David Dunlap Observatory
- List of University of Toronto buildings
