= Canadian Meteorological Centre =

Meteorological office in Quebec, Canada

Coordinates: 45°29′0.15″N 73°47′16.47″W

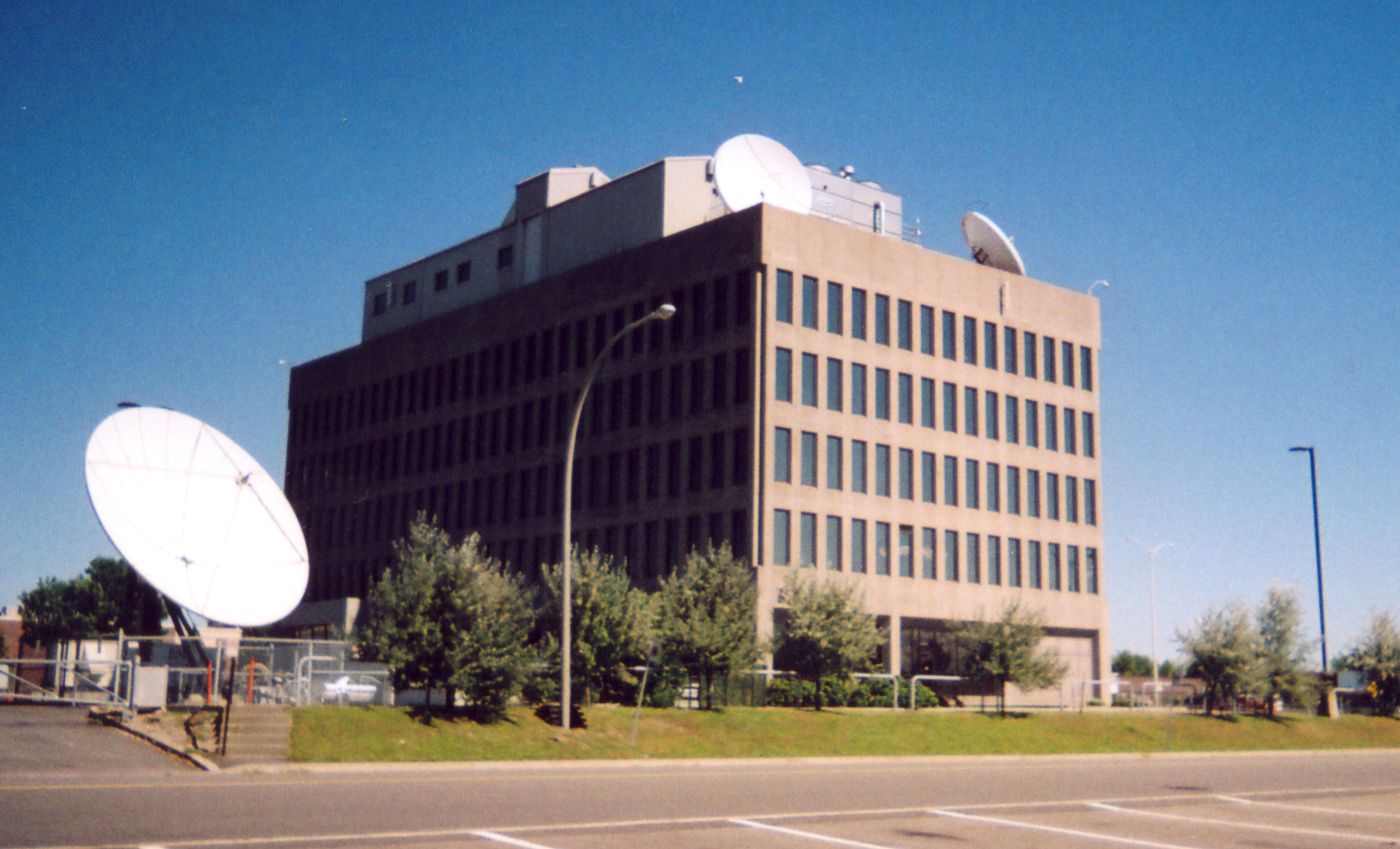
CMC building viewed from the West

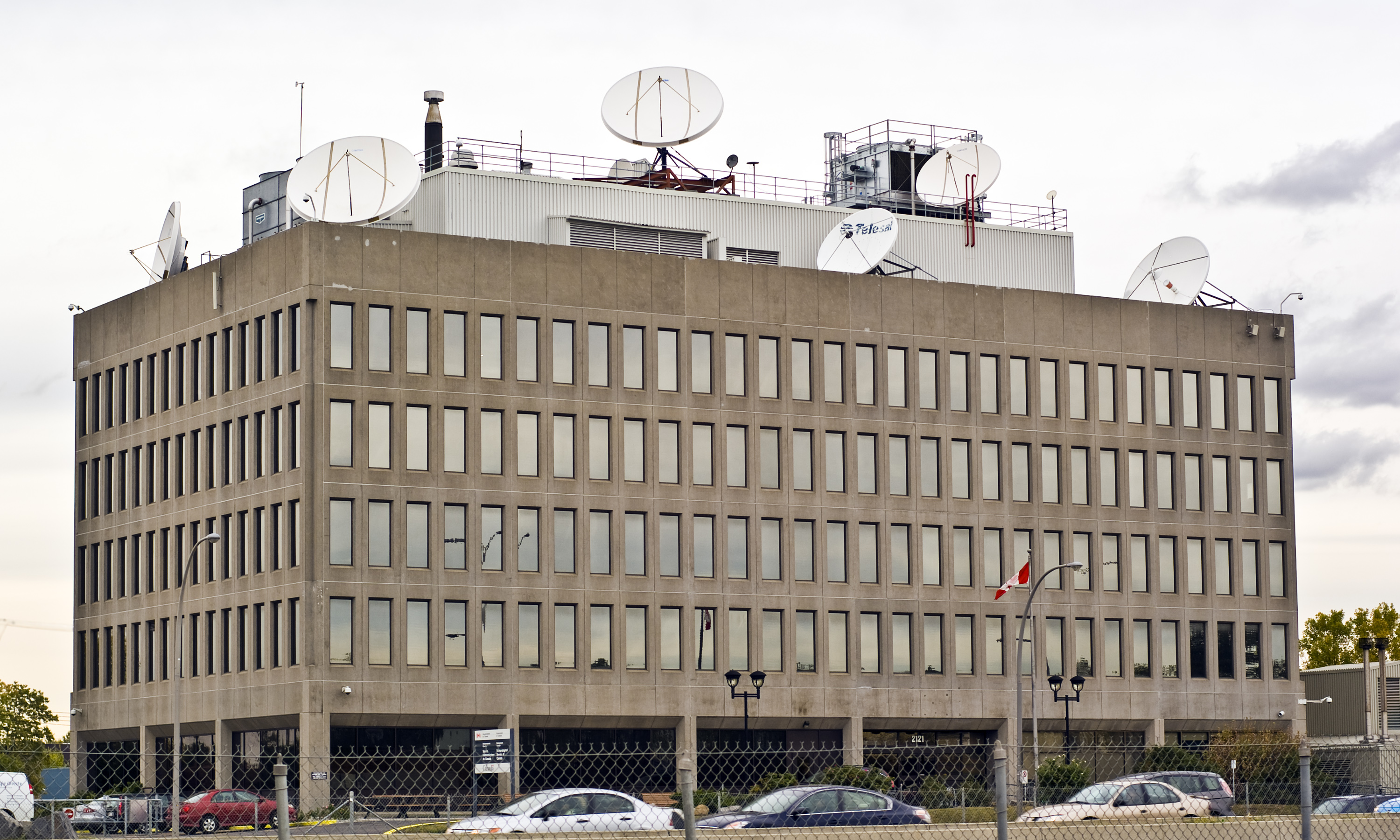
CMC building viewed from the South

The Canadian Meteorological Centre (CMC; French: Centre météorologique canadien), located in Dorval, Quebec, is the branch of Environment Canada's Meteorological Service of Canada that is tasked with providing forecast guidance to national and regional prediction centres, and is responsible for running the Global Environmental Multiscale (GEM) model, often referred to as the CMC model, together with its regional and ensemble variants. It is made up of three branches:

The Informatics Branch provides centralized computing and telecommunications services to meet the Atmospheric Environment Programs' objectives, support other departmental operations, and assist other approved users. It operates and maintains the supercomputer facility in Dorval and various telecommunications networks.

The Operations Branch is responsible for the meteorological operations of numerous production systems for weather, climate, air quality, and environmental programs at the Canadian Meteorological Centre. In addition, the Branch provides highly specialized support to environmental emergencies. Its outputs contribute and satisfy national and international Meteorological Service of Canada's operational and related commitments.

The Development Branch is responsible for the technology transfer from research to operations of the Canadian environmental prediction system. In addition, the Branch is responsible for developing and improving systems and products for the Meteorological Service of Canada and other important clients and partners, and to ensure the proper technology transfer of these into an operational environment. One of its main components is the Recherche en Prévision Numérique.

== See also ==
- André Robert father of Canadian numerical models
- Numerical weather prediction
- Atmospheric models
