= Louis Beaufort Stewart =

Canadian astronomer & academic (1861-1937)

Louis Beaufort Stewart (27 January 1861 – 15 March 1937) was a Canadian astronomer, civil engineer and academic. He served as the president of the Royal Astronomical Society of Canada from 1912 to 1913, and played a key role in preserving the Toronto Magnetic and Meteorological Observatory building at the University of Toronto.

Born in Port Hope, Canada West in 1861, Stewart served in the 92nd Regiment during the North-West Rebellion of 1885. The following year, he began conducting topographical surveys near Sulphur Mountain in Alberta for his father, who had been appointed by the Canadian government as superintendent of Rocky Mountains Park (now Banff National Park). In 1887, Stewart headed to Ottawa and passed the examination to become a Dominion Topographical Surveyor.

At the suggestion of Professor John Galbraith, Stewart applied for a lecturer position in the department of land surveying at the University of Toronto. He began lecturing in 1888 and was promoted to full professorship by 1901. As a professor, Stewart continued his surveying research, among them were the Klondike region of Yukon in 1899, Lake Timagami in 1904, the Labrador Eclipse Expedition of 1905, and the mouth of the Nelson River at Hudson Bay in 1912. During summers between 1918 and 1921, he surveyed parts of Eastern Canada between Truro and Halifax in Nova Scotia and in the lower St. Lawrence River. Through his investigations into geodesy, Stewart also became interested in astronomy. He joined the Royal Astronomical Society in 1905 and became the society's president in 1912. In 1908, Stewart successfully lobbied the university to preserve and upgrade the aging Toronto Magnetic and Meteorological Observatory for his department's use.

Stewart stepped down from his academic post after reaching the mandatory retirement age in 1932. He remained active in scientific research until his death in 1937.
