= William Armstrong (Canadian artist) =

Canadian artist

- Born: July 28, 1822; Dublin, Ireland
- Died: June 9, 1914 (aged 91); Toronto, Ontario
- Known for: Painting Photography

William Armstrong RCA (July 28, 1822 – June 9, 1914) was a Canadian artist and one of the early professional artists of Toronto, Ontario.

== Life and work ==
William Armstrong was born in Dublin, Ireland on July 28, 1822. He studied art in Ireland, then completed an apprenticeship in England with the Midland Railway to become a railway engineer. He immigrated to Canada in 1851, settling in Toronto and began work with the railway. He found a market for his artwork with the illustrated news who covered the events in the colonies. His watercolours of local events and scenes were reproduced as monochrome wood engravings so they could be included in these weekly periodicals.

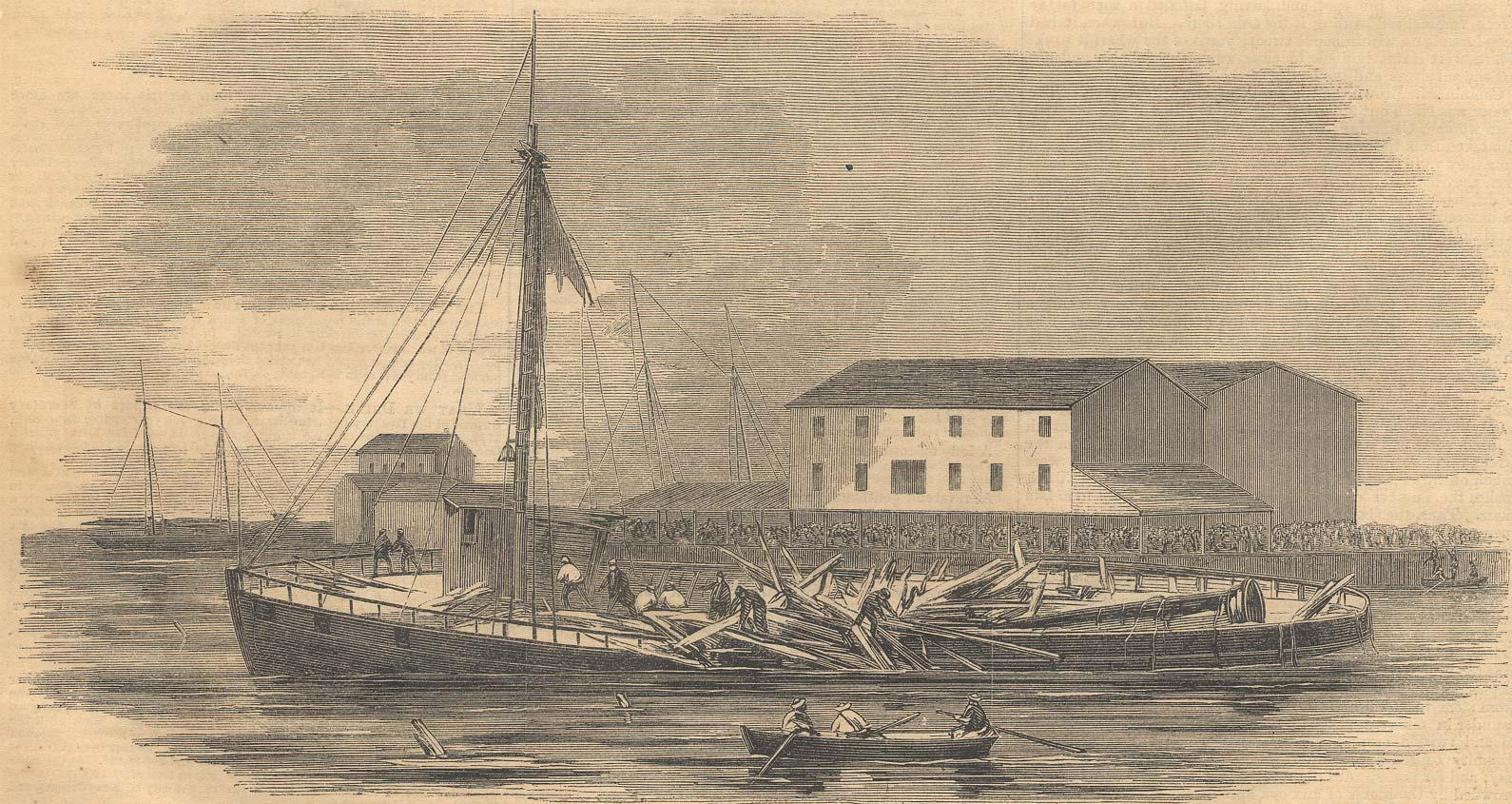
Explosion of the steamboat Inkermann at Browne's Wharf on the Toronto waterfront, on 29 May 1857 in Toronto, Ontario, Canada; engraving of a William Armstrong image, published in Frank Leslie's Illustrated Newspaper of New York

Armstrong added photography to his skills and in 1855 he started Armstrong and Beere with his nephew Daniel Manders Beere (1833-1909). Humphrey Lloyd Hime (1833-1903) joined them two years later to form Armstrong, Beere and Hime. The company was responsible for completing a 360 degree panorama sequence of the City of Toronto in 1856-1857 to support the city's bid to become the capital of Canada. The company ceased operation in 1861.

Armstrong marketed his skill as a draftsman as an asset to those who were interested in expanding Canada westward. Beginning in 1859, Armstrong made a number of trips west accompanying various survey expeditions. His drawings were used to report the activities of the expeditions as well as the terrain and human activity observed.

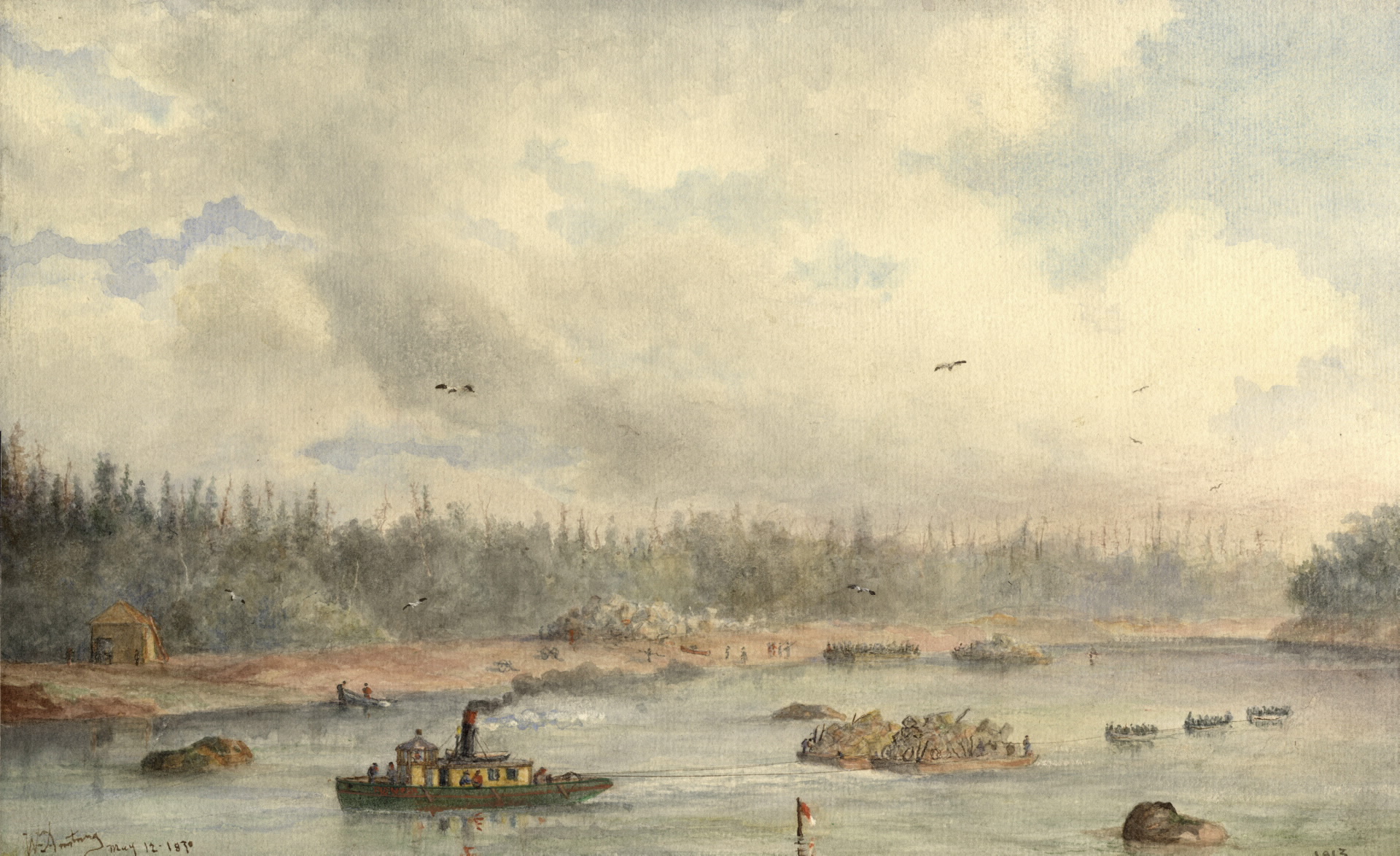
The Red River Expedition, Purgatory Landing (1870) watercolour

In 1870, Armstrong accompanied the Wolseley Expedition to the Red River Colony, recording the incredible effort required to move the military force through the Canadian wilderness. One of his compositions, Red River Expedition, Purgatory Landing was reproduced as a wood engraving on the cover of the Canadian Illustrated News on July 9, 1970 to accompany their coverage of the expedition's progress.

He won numerous prizes as an artist at provincial exhibitions, and his work was displayed at the Exposition Universelle in Paris in 1855, and at the Dublin International Exhibition, 1865. He exhibited with the Ontario Society of Artists and was a member of the Royal Canadian Academy of Arts until 1887, when he resigned.

In 1864 Armstrong began to teach drawing at the Toronto Normal School. He taught at the University of Toronto from 1872 to 1877. He retired in 1897 but continued teaching art from his home until his death. He died in Toronto on 9 June 1914.

A number of his watercolour landscapes of the Great Lakes may be found in collections such as the Art Gallery of Ontario, the National Gallery of Canada, the Musée national des beaux-arts du Québec and the Thunder Bay Historical Museum. He painted the watercolour The Arrival of the Prince of Wales at Toronto (1860) which hangs in the National Gallery of Canada in Ottawa, Ontario. Armstrong depicted grim working conditions inside Victorian Toronto's industrial plants in his pastel drawing Toronto Rolling Mills (1864), which forms part of the Toronto Public Library's J. Ross Robertson Collection. His watercolour painting, Thunder Cape, Lake Superior (1867), hangs in the National Archives of Canada.

== Gallery ==
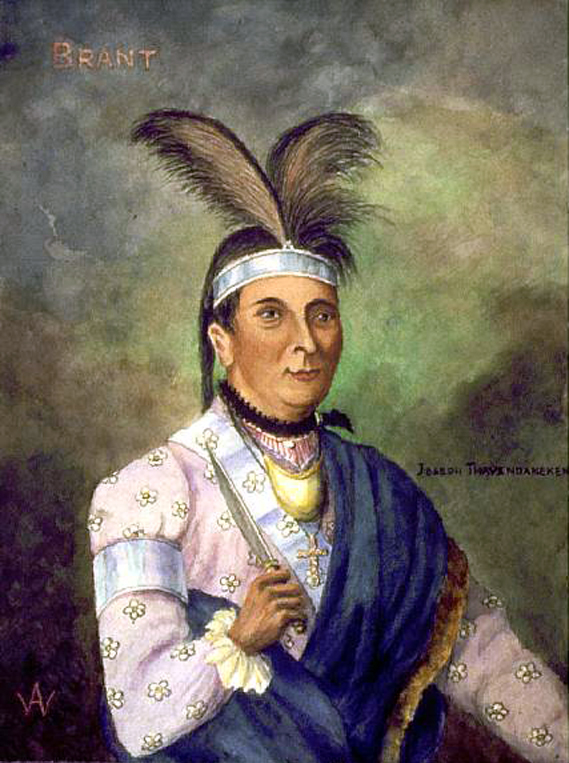
Joseph Brant, watercolour

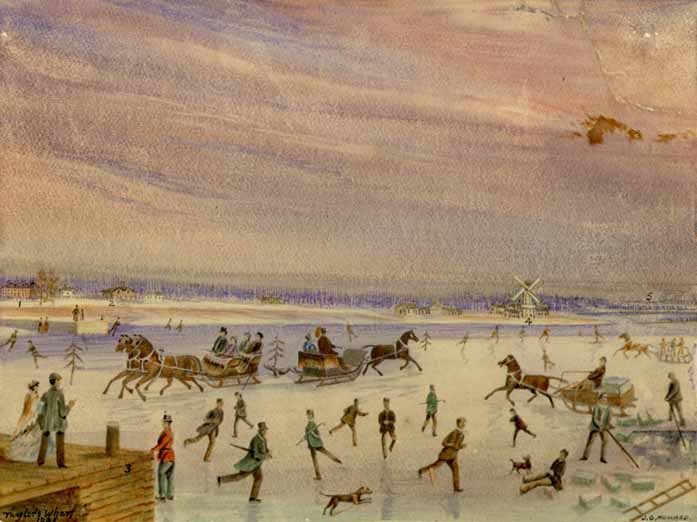
Winter scene on Toronto Bay (1835), watercolour

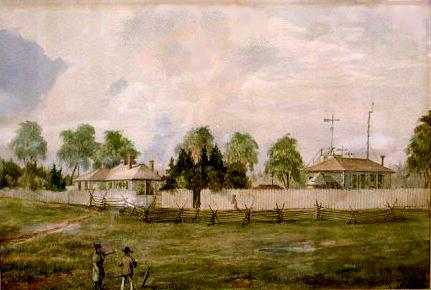
Toronto Magnetic Observatory (1852), watercolour

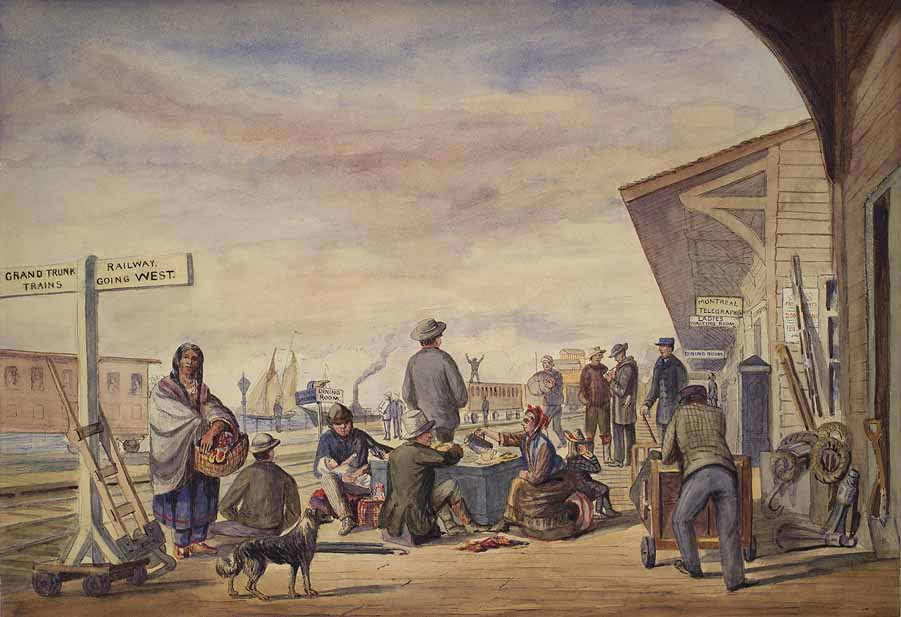
Toronto's first Union Station (1859), watercolour

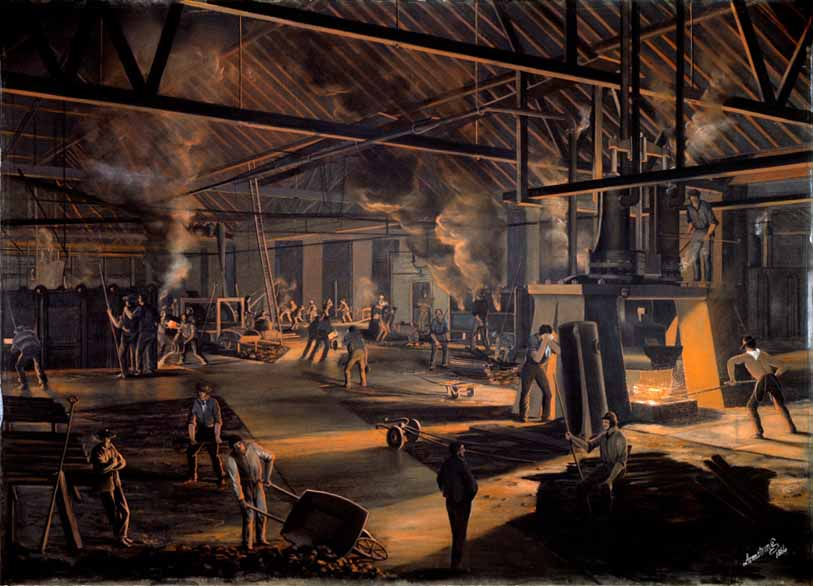
Toronto Rolling Mills (1864), pastel

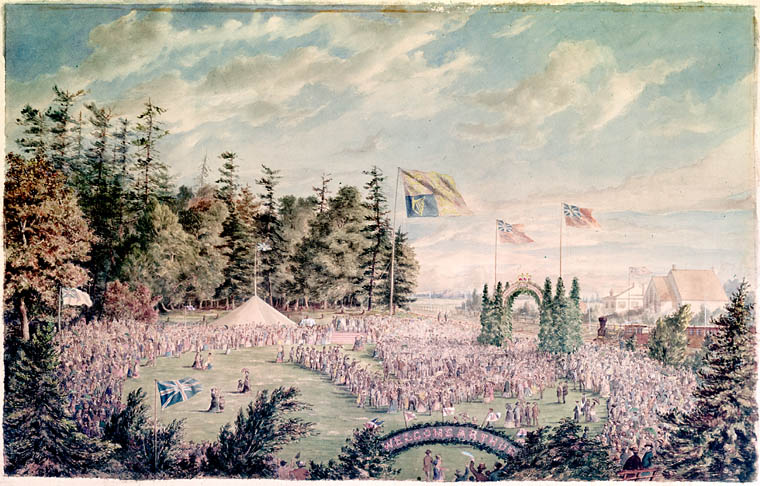
Prince Arthur Arriving for the Ceremony of Turning the First Sod of the Toronto, Grey and Bruce Railway, Weston (1869), watercolour

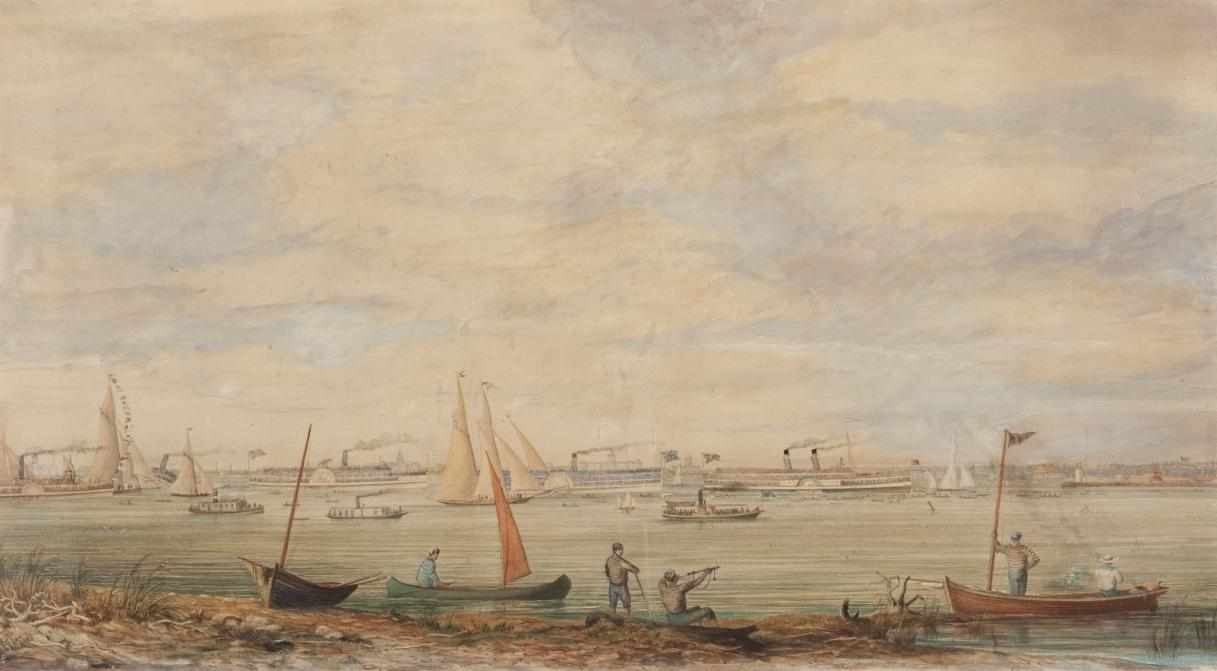
The Champion Sculler's Return from England (1879), watercolour—the celebration after Ned Hanlan returned to Toronto after defeating the English rower, W. Elliott, in 1879

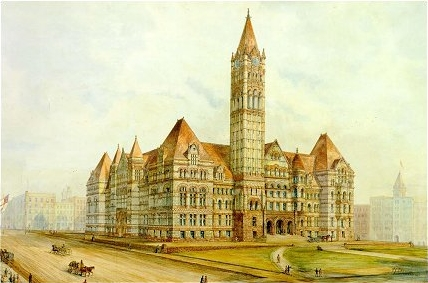
Third City Hall (circa 1899), watercolour

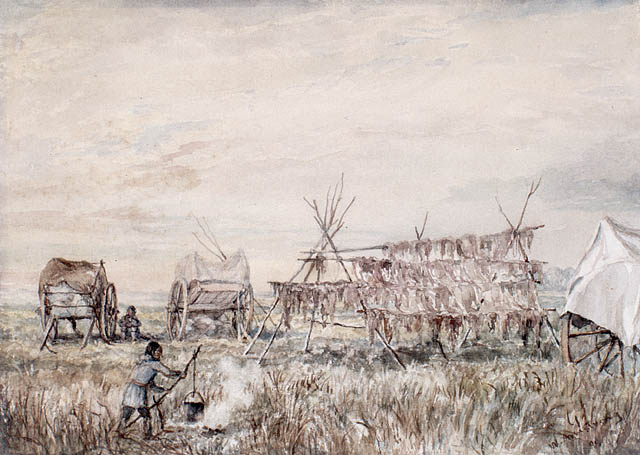
Buffalo Meat Drying, White Horse Plains, Red River (1899), watercolour

== More ==
- William Armstrong, Janet E. Clark, Thorold J. Tronrud,. William Armstrong, 1822-1914: Watercolour drawings of new Ontario, from Georgian Bay to Rat Portage (Thunder Bay: Thunder Bay Art Gallery, 1996) ISBN 9780920539477 WorldCat
- Portage at Deux Rivières, 1893; Collection of the Winnipeg Art Gallery
