= Patrick McTaggart-Cowan =

Canadian meteorologist (1912–1997)

Patrick Duncan McTaggart-Cowan
- McTaggart-Cowan in 1964
- Born: May 31, 1912; Edinburgh, Scotland
- Died: October 11, 1997 (aged 85); Bracebridge, Ontario, Canada
- Education: University of British Columbia; Corpus Christi College, Oxford
- Occupation: Meteorologist
- Known for: President of Simon Fraser University
- Awards: Order of Canada; Order of the British Empire; Patterson Medal

Patrick Duncan McTaggart-Cowan, OC MBE (May 31, 1912 – October 11, 1997) was a Canadian meteorologist and the first president of Simon Fraser University.

Born in Edinburgh, Scotland, he moved to North Vancouver, British Columbia, Canada with his family in 1913. He received a degree in Mathematics and Physics from the University of British Columbia in 1933. A Rhodes Scholar, he received a Bachelor of Arts in Natural Science from Corpus Christi College, Oxford in 1936.

Returning to Canada, he joined the Meteorological Service of Canada and was an officer in charge of the meteorological service in Newfoundland from 1937 to 1942. During World War II, he was the chief meteorologist for the RAF Ferry Command and was made a Member of the Order of the British Empire in 1944.

After the war, he moved to Ontario and re-joined the Meteorological Service of Canada becoming its director in 1959. He served as president of the Canadian Branch of the Royal Meteorological Society 1959–60.

In 1963, he was appointed the first president of Simon Fraser University and served until 1968. He then became the Executive Director of the Science Council of Canada and served until his retirement in 1975.

In 1979, he was made an Officer of the Order of Canada for his "internationally recognized achievements in meteorology". He was awarded seven honorary doctorates.

In 1939, he married Margaret Palmer and they had two children: Gillian and James Duncan.

His brother was the naturalist Ian McTaggart-Cowan, and his sister the architect Pamela Charlesworth.

Academic offices
Preceded by New position	President of Simon Fraser University; 1 January 1964–31 May 1968	Succeeded by John F. Ellis, acting
