= Robert Frederic Stupart =

Canadian meteorologist

Sir Robert Frederic Stupart
- Born: October 24, 1857; Aurora, Canada West
- Died: September 27, 1940 (aged 82); Toronto, Ontario
- Known for: Meteorologist

Sir Robert Frederic Stupart, FRSC (October 24, 1857 – September 27, 1940) was a Canadian meteorologist.

Born in Aurora, Canada West, the son of Robert Douglas Stupart, of the Royal Navy, and Eliza Lee, Stupart graduated from Upper Canada College and joined the Meteorological Service of Canada in 1872. Stupart was a senior inspector and probability officer at the Toronto Observatory. In 1894, he was appointed superintendent and director of the meteorological service and was appointed director of the Toronto Magnetic and Meteorological Observatory. He retired in 1929.

In 1916, he was created a Knight Bachelor in recognition of his services. In 1901, he was made a Fellow of the Royal Society of Canada. He was a member of the Royal Astronomical Society of Canada and served as its president from 1901 to 1903. He served as president of the American Meteorological Society from 1922 to 1923.

Stupart married Marion Dallas in 1886. They had three sons and one daughter. Their son, Frederic Gustavus Stupart, was killed in World War I fighting during the Battle of the Somme on October 22, 1916.
