= R. E. Munn =

Canadian climatologist and meteorologist (1919–2013)

- Born: 1919; Winnipeg, Manitoba, Canada
- Died: 7 September 2013 (aged 93–94)
- Awards: Patterson Medal (1972)

Academic background
- Education: University of Michigan; McMaster University

Academic work
- Discipline: climatology meteorology
- Institutions: International Institute of Applied Systems Analysis; University of Toronto
- Notable works: Global Environmental Change

Robert Edward Munn (1919 – 7 September 2013) was a Canadian climatologist and meteorologist.

== Early life and education ==
Munn was born in Winnipeg, Manitoba, and was a grandson of Stuart Jenkins, a well-known writer in the 1890s for Scientific American. Jenkins' frequent lectures about natural sciences helped develop Munn's interest in the inductive sciences, which he studied at McMaster University.

== Career ==
Upon graduation in 1941, Munn became a weather forecaster, spending 1943 to 1949 in Gander, Newfoundland where he briefed RAF Ferry Command and other wartime pilots on their way to Britain.

In the late 1950s, Ted registered as a PhD student at the University of Michigan. At the time of his graduation in the early 1960s, he was the only Canadian meteorologist with training in air pollution. He served as president of the Canadian Branch of the Royal Meteorological Society, 1964–66, and on several international committees, including WMO and ICSU. He spent a winter in Stockholm working with Bert Bolin on the acid rain issue, and for 17 years he was editor-in-chief of the SCOPE series of 60 books relating to interdisciplinary environmental topics.

In 1983, he was appointed head of the environmental group at the International Institute of Applied Systems Analysis in Austria. Then in 1990, he returned to the University of Toronto, to the Institute of Environmental Studies, where he taught a course on Global Environment Change, and edited a five-volume encyclopedia, Global Environmental Change (John Wiley, UK.) Each volume is about 750 pages in length.

Munn was the founder of the Journal Boundary Layer Meteorology.

Munn was elected a Fellow of the Royal Society of Canada in 1985 and published several books and many scientific articles on environmental topics.

== Publications ==
- Ted Munn, ed. (2002). The Encyclopedia of Global Environmental Change. Wiley. ISBN 9780471977964.
- Ted Munn (1973). Global Environmental Monitoring Systems (GEMS): Action Plan for Phase I. ICSU-SCOPE.
- R.E. Munn; J.W.M. la Rivière; N. van Lookeren Campagne (31 July 1996). Policy Making in an Era of Global Environmental Change. Springer Science & Business Media. pp. 11–. ISBN 978-0-7923-3872-7.
- R. E. Munn; John R. Garratt; P.A. Taylor (30 September 1996). Boundary-Layer Meteorology 25th Anniversary Volume, 1970–1995: Invited Reviews and Selected Contributions to Recognise Ted Munn's Contribution as Editor Over the Past 25 Years. Springer Science & Business Media. ISBN 978-0-7923-4191-8.
