= Ted Shepherd =

Canadian climatologist (born 1958)

Ted Shepherd FRS
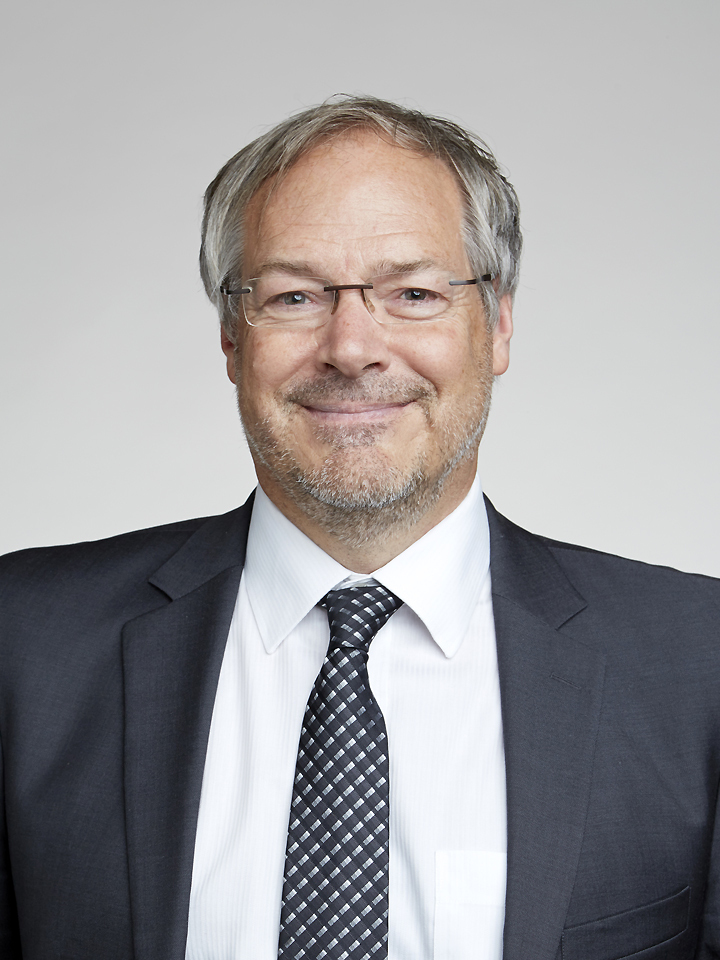
- Shepherd in 2016
- Born: 6 August 1958 (age 68)
- Awards: Royal Society Wolfson Research Merit Award
- Scientific career
- Fields: Atmospheric dynamics; Climate dynamics
- Thesis: Rossby waves and two-dimensional turbulence in the presence of a large-scale zonal jet (1984)
- Doctoral advisor: Peter B. Rhines; Jule Gregory Charney
- Other academic advisors: Michael E. McIntyre
- Website: met.reading.ac.uk/~sj903980

Theodore Gordon Shepherd FRS (born 6 August 1958) is the Grantham Professor of Climate Science at the University of Reading.

== Education and career ==
Shepherd was educated at the University of Toronto where he was awarded a Bachelor of Science degree in Mathematics and Physics in 1979. He completed his postgraduate education at Massachusetts Institute of Technology (MIT) where he was awarded a PhD in 1984 for research supervised by Jule Gregory Charney and Peter B. Rhines on turbulence in Rossby waves.

Following his PhD, Shepherd was appointed a postdoctoral research fellow at St Catharine's College, Cambridge supervised by Michael E. McIntyre in the Department of Applied Mathematics and Theoretical Physics (DAMTP) at the University of Cambridge. After 24 years working at the University of Toronto in Canada he moved back to the United Kingdom in 2012, funded by a Royal Society Wolfson Research Merit Award.

== Research ==
Shepherd is a dynamical meteorologist whose interests range from theoretical geophysical fluid dynamics to climate modelling and data analysis, with a focus on atmospheric circulation. This span from fundamentals to applications has been a hallmark of his research.

Shepherd worked at the University of Toronto from 1988-2012, where he made pioneering contributions to Hamiltonian fluid mechanics while initiating and leading the Canadian national climate modelling effort focussed on ozone-climate coupling. He made several pivotal contributions to the understanding of the role of climate variability and change in interpreting the observed ozone record and in predicting future ozone recovery. Since moving to the University of Reading in 2012, he has highlighted the important role of atmospheric circulation in climate change, which has implications for regional adaptation and societal risk.

He has held leadership roles in scientific assessments of both climate Intergovernmental Panel on Climate Change (IPCC) and stratospheric ozone (World Meteorological Organization (WMO)/United Nations Environment Programme (UNEP)) and in the World Climate Research Programme (WCRP).

== Awards and honours ==
Shepherd was elected a Fellow of the Royal Society (FRS) in 2016, a Fellow of the Royal Society of Canada in 2007, the American Geophysical Union in 2010, and the American Meteorological Society in 2005. He received the Patterson Medal in 2004 for distinguished service to Meteorology in Canada.
