= Meteorological Service of Canada =

Weather and meteorological institute

- Service météorologique du Canada
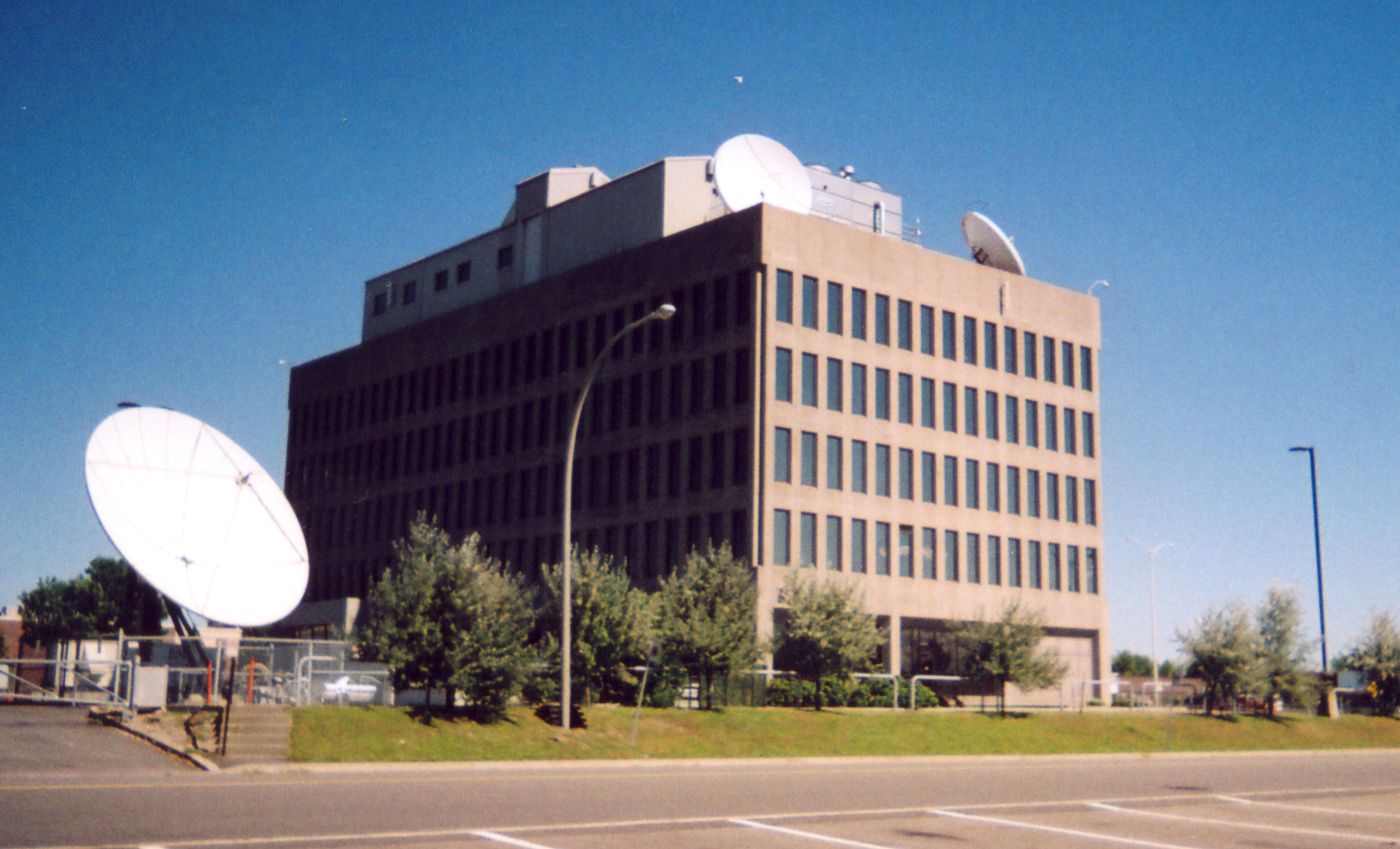
- Canadian Metrological Centre, Dorval, Quebec

Agency overview
- Formed: 1871
- Jurisdiction: Government of Canada
- Headquarters: Toronto, Ontario
- Minister responsible: ADM Cecile Siewe
- Parent department: Environment and Climate Change Canada
- Website: weather.gc.ca

The Meteorological Service of Canada (MSC; French: Service météorologique du Canada – SMC) is a branch of Environment and Climate Change Canada, which primarily provides public meteorological information and weather forecasts and warnings of severe weather and other environmental hazards. MSC also monitors and conducts research on the climate, atmospheric science, air quality, water quantities, ice and other environmental issues. Until March 2026, MSC operated Weatheradio Canada, a network of radio stations throughout Canada transmitting weather and environmental information 24 hours a day.

== History ==
=== Private Observations ===
Prior to 1840, meteorological observations in Canada were made by private individuals, other entities (like HBC), and explorers, but this information was not provided to the general public.

=== Her Majesty's Magnetic and Meteorological Observatory ===
In 1840, British officials (British Ordnance Department) and the Royal Society established an observatory in Toronto, Canada West, one of a few across the British Empire and likely modeled after the Royal Observatory, Greenwich.

=== Meteorological Service of the Dominion ===
The Toronto observatory ended in 1853, but the colonial government of the province of Canada took over the service and continued collecting climate data. On May 1, 1871, the new Dominion of Canada established the Meteorological Service of Canada by providing a $5000 grant to Professor G. T. Kingston of the University of Toronto to establish a network of weather observations. This information was collected and made available to the public from 1877 onwards. The MSC was then assigned under the Department of Marine and Fisheries.

=== Meteorological Division of the Air Services Branch ===
From 1936 to 1946 the services assigned under the Department of Transport as the Meteorological Division of the Air Services Branch' and as the Meteorological Branch from 1956.

In 1939, the Meteorological Division, Air Services Branch was expanding rapidly to serve commercial aviation. In September 1939 the full-time staff of the Meteorological Division based in Toronto numbered 213, of which 51 were meteorologists and 57 were meteorological observers.

=== Atmospheric Environment Service and Meteorological Service of Canada ===
In 1971 the Canadian Meteorological Service was established under the Department of Environment (Environment Canada) in 1971. The AES was renamed later as the Meteorological Service of Canada.

== Organization ==
There are currently six public weather forecast offices:

- Pacific and Yukon Storm Prediction Centre in Vancouver, British Columbia
- Prairie and Arctic Storm Prediction Centre, split between an office in Edmonton, Alberta and Winnipeg, Manitoba
- Ontario Storm Prediction Centre (Toronto)
- Quebec Storm Prediction Centre (Montreal, Quebec)
- Atlantic Storm Prediction Centre (Dartmouth, Nova Scotia). The Atlantic Storm Prediction Centre also houses the Canadian Hurricane Centre.
- Newfoundland and Labrador Weather Office (Gander, Newfoundland and Labrador)

There are two centres dedicated to aviation weather forecasting: Canadian Meteorological Aviation Centre-East, located in Montreal, and Canadian Meteorological Aviation Centre-West, located in Edmonton.

MSC also operates the Canadian Center for Meteorological and Environmental Prediction, which is tasked with providing forecast guidance, and the Canadian Ice Service, which provides ice observations and forecasts for mariners. In support of Canada's military, some MSC meteorologists are seconded to the Department of National Defence.

The Meteorological Service of Canada was ISO9001:2000 Certified for their Hydrometric Monitoring Program.

== Heads of the Observatory/MSC ==
- 1840, Lieutenant C.J.B. Riddell, Royal Artillery
- 1841, Captain J.G. Younghusband
- 1841–1853, Captain Sir John Henry Lefroy
- 1853–1855, Professor John Bradford Cherriman, Provisional Director of the Toronto Observatory
- 1855–1880, Professor G. T. Kingston, Director of the Toronto Observatory, Superintendent of the MSC
- 1880–1894, Charles Carpmael, Director
- 1894–1929, Sir R. Frederick Stupart, Director
- 1929–1946, John Patterson M.A. F.R.C.S., Director
- 1946–1959, Andrew Thomson D.Sc., M.A. OBE, Controller of the Meteorological Division
- 1959–1964, Patrick D. McTaggart-Cowan DSc LLD MBE, Director of the Meteorological Division
- 1964–1971, J.R.H. Noble, Assistant Minister, Atmospheric Environment Service
- 1964–1971, J.R.H. Noble, Administrator, Atmospheric Environment Service

== Headquarters ==
- 1840, Old Fort York (Bathurst Street), Toronto, Upper Canada — housed in unused barracks
- 1840–1853, Kings' College, Toronto, Upper Canada/Canada West — still located at King's College Circle, University of Toronto (see Toronto Magnetic and Meteorological Observatory)
- 1907–1971, Dominion Meteorological Building, 315 Bloor Street West, Toronto, Ontario — now Admissions and Awards Building, University of Toronto
- 1972–present, 4905 Dufferin Street, Toronto, Ontario (by architects Boignon & Armstrong)

== See also ==
- Canadian Hurricane Centre
- Environment and Climate Change Canada
- Canadian Meteorological Centre
- Canadian Meteorological and Oceanographic Society
- National Weather Service, the American equivalent.
- NinJo, SMC forecasting workstation software
- Forecast region
- R. E. Munn
