= Canadian Meteorological and Oceanographic Society =

Professional society in Canada

The Canadian Meteorological and Oceanographic Society (CMOS; French: Société canadienne de météorologie et d'océanographie) is the national society of individuals and organisations dedicated to advancing atmospheric and oceanic sciences and related environmental disciplines in Canada.

CMOS was officially created in 1967 as the Canadian Meteorological Society, and adopted its present name in 1977, following an invitation by the Canadian Meteorological Society to the oceanographic community in Canada to join the Society. However, CMOS has a rich history dating back to 1939 when it was known as the Canadian Branch of the Royal Meteorological Society. The current (2025-2027) president of CMOS is meteorologist Patrick McCarthy.

In 2007, CMOS issued a position statement on global warming:

CMOS endorses the process of periodic climate science assessment carried out by the Intergovernmental Panel on Climate Change and supports the conclusion, in its Third Assessment Report, which states that the balance of evidence suggests a discernible human influence on global climate.

== Notable endorsed weathercasters ==
- Claire Martin - former CBC News Vancouver and Toronto

== Awards issued ==
The Society issues a number of annual awards:

- The President's Prize
- The J.P. Tully Medal in Oceanography
- The Dr. Andrew Thomson Prize in Applied Meteorology
- The Prize in Applied Oceanography
- Rube Hornstein Medal in Operational Meteorology
- Roger Daley Postdoctoral Publication Award

The CMOS website presents a list of recipients in past years

== See also ==
- Indian-Ocean Rim Association
