= McGill Atmospheric and Oceanic Sciences =

Academic department at McGill University

Coordinates: 45.5042°N 73.5747°W

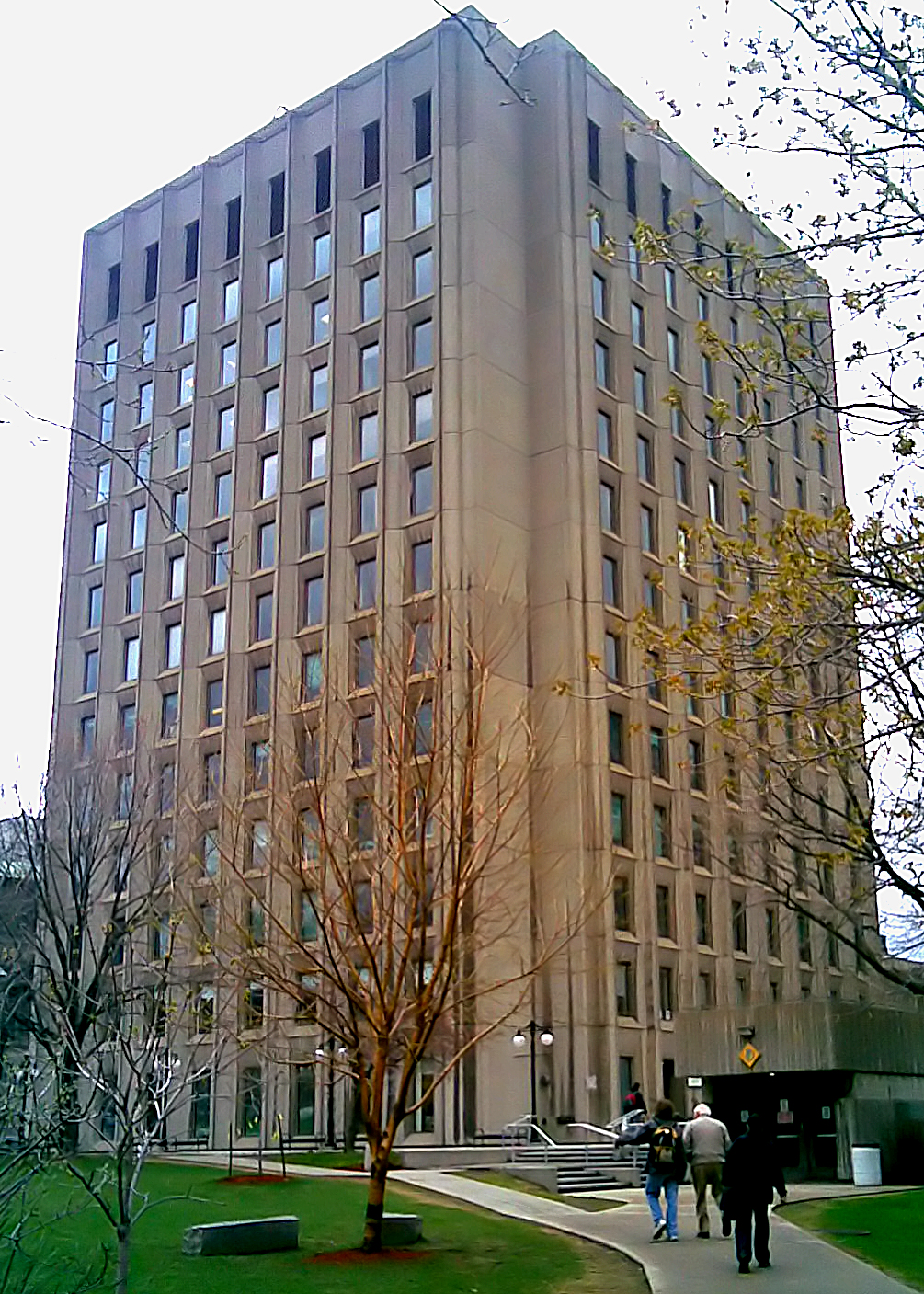
- The departement is inside Burnside Hall
- Type: Public department
- Established: 1959
- Affiliations: McGill
- Faculty: 11 faculty and 6 associate faculty

The Department of Atmospheric and Oceanic Sciences of McGill University is the largest university atmospheric-oceanic sciences group in Canada. In 2012, it has 11 Faculty and 6 Associate Faculty members, 5 support staff, 14 research associates and postdoctoral fellows, and 31 graduate students. It is known worldwide, in particular for weather radar research and Arctic studies. It has operated the second oldest weather observatory in Canada since 1862.

== History ==
Since 1840, Charles Smallwood, a medical doctor and avid amateur meteorologist, was taking daily weather reports at his house in the village of Saint-Martin on Île Jésus (now Laval a suburb of Montreal). He was named "honorary professor" in Meteorology at McGill University in 1856, and at his suggestion, the first McGill Weather Observatory was established in 1862. The first instruments were donated by Smallwood et he was the first director of the Observatory. Since then, there is regular measurement of meteorological variables taken on University grounds, one of the longest record in Canada.

After the death of Smallwood in 1873, the position of professor in Meteorology was not filled for 88 years. However, the director of the Observatory was, and the second to occupy this post was the engineer C. H. McLeod, an assistant to Smallwood since his university days. McLeod began his term while Canada was setting up a Meteorological Service. He was instrumental to its development and to research on the subject by McGill. Professors of the McGill's Physics department began to work on meteorological projects and later, professors from Geography did too.

Following the Second World War, two active atmospheric research groups emerged at McGill. Dr J. Stewart Marshall and R.H. Douglas led a radar meteorology group (Stormy Weather Group) in the Physics Department, and Dr F. Kenneth Hare directed an arctic meteorology program in Geography. These two groups united in 1959 to form the Department of Meteorology. In 1986, McGill University formed the first Canadian group of research on climate with the National Research Council of Canada (CNRC). Four years later, the mandate was widened, and its staffing enlarged. It is now the Centre for Climate and Global Change Research (C2GCR). The department started the Centre for research in mesoscale meteorology, in collaboration with the Meteorological Service of Canada, and it operates J. S. Marshall Radar Observatory since 1968.

Since 1850, McGill has been involved in oceanography but the main development in this field came when the Centre for Marine Studies was created in 1963, later renamed Oceanographical Institute. Under the leadership of Dr Max J. Dunbar, the Institute was managing Master and Doctorate programs in physical oceanography, and marine biology. In 1987, the Institute because the McGill department of Oceanography. In January 1992, the Meteorology department became the Department of Atmospheric and Oceanic Sciences when the Oceanography department merged with it.

Since its creation, the department has been a Canadian leader in the training of many distinguished atmospheric scientists. McGill has awarded over 230 M.Sc. degrees and more than 80 Ph.D. degrees in this field.

== Programs ==
The department offers a BSc degree, with courses in atmospheric dynamics, thermodynamics and chemistry, in cloud physics, in climatology and general oceanography. The students maybe follow training toward research, a teaching, or operational meteorologist. The department offers one year certificates for students coming from other departments, like physics, to pursue M.Sc. and Ph.D. programs in meteorology and oceanography.

In M.Sc. and Ph.D., the speciality are:

- Atmospheric chemistry
- Dynamics of climates and paleoclimates
- Physical meteorology physique and cloud physics
- Atmospheric dynamics and synoptic scale meteorology
- Data analysis and numerical weather predictions
- Convection and other severe weather
- Fluid dynamics and turbulence
- Physical oceanography
- Weather radar and remote sensing of precipitation

== See also ==
- Burnside Hall
- J.S. Marshall Radar Observatory
- Weather radar
