= J. S. Marshall Radar Observatory =

Radar station in Quebec, Canada

The J.S. Marshall Radar Observatory (or MRO) is a McGill University facility in Sainte-Anne-de-Bellevue, Quebec, Canada housing several weather radars and other meteorological sensors, many of them running around the clock. It is one of the components of the McGill Atmospheric and Oceanic Sciences department where students in remote sensing perform their research. The main radar was part of the Canadian weather radar network, on contract with the Meteorological Service of Canada, as well as a research device, up to October 3, 2018.

== Purpose ==
The main focus of the MRO is teaching and research. The group upgrades and designs radars, develops new ways to process the radar signals and use the resulting data, and performs research on the physics of weather events and their prediction. Results of the research are published in scientific journals and transferred for use by the weather office.

== History ==
In 1862, a first Weather Observatory was built by McGill University. The instruments were donated by Dr. Charles Smallwood (MD), who had personally taken weather data with them since 1840. This station became one of the first in the weather station network set up after the telegraph became ubiquitous.

In 1943, "Project Stormy Weather" was assigned to J.S. Marshall by the Department of National Defence. The aim was to find a use for noise in radar echoes that had proved to be from weather. Marshall and his doctoral student Walter Palmer later received recognition for their work on the drop size distribution in mid-latitude rain that led to the rain rate relation to radar reflectivity (Z-R relation). Following World War II, Marshall and R.H. Douglas formed the "Stormy Weather Group" at McGill University and continued their work.

Different radars were used by the Stormy Weather Group to research the characteristics of precipitation at Dawson College, continuing the tradition of meteorology at McGill. It was decided to build a new facility in 1968 in Sainte-Anne-de-Bellevue, on the western tip of Montreal Island and to transfer research activity from Dawson College to this facility. This new observatory was later renamed the J.S. Marshall Radar Observatory in honor of its founder.

On February 27, 2017, as part of the replacement of Canadian weather radars, the Minister of Environment and Climate Change, Catherine McKenna, announced the signing of an 83 million Canadian dollar contract with the company Selex ES for the purchase of 20 new dual-polarization S-band radars. The McGill radar was the second to be replaced, with construction of the new Blainville radar extending from spring to summer 2018. The WMN radar completed 50 years of daily service to Canadians on September 30, 2018, but the Observatory will continue research at the same site with a range of instruments.

== Main instrument ==
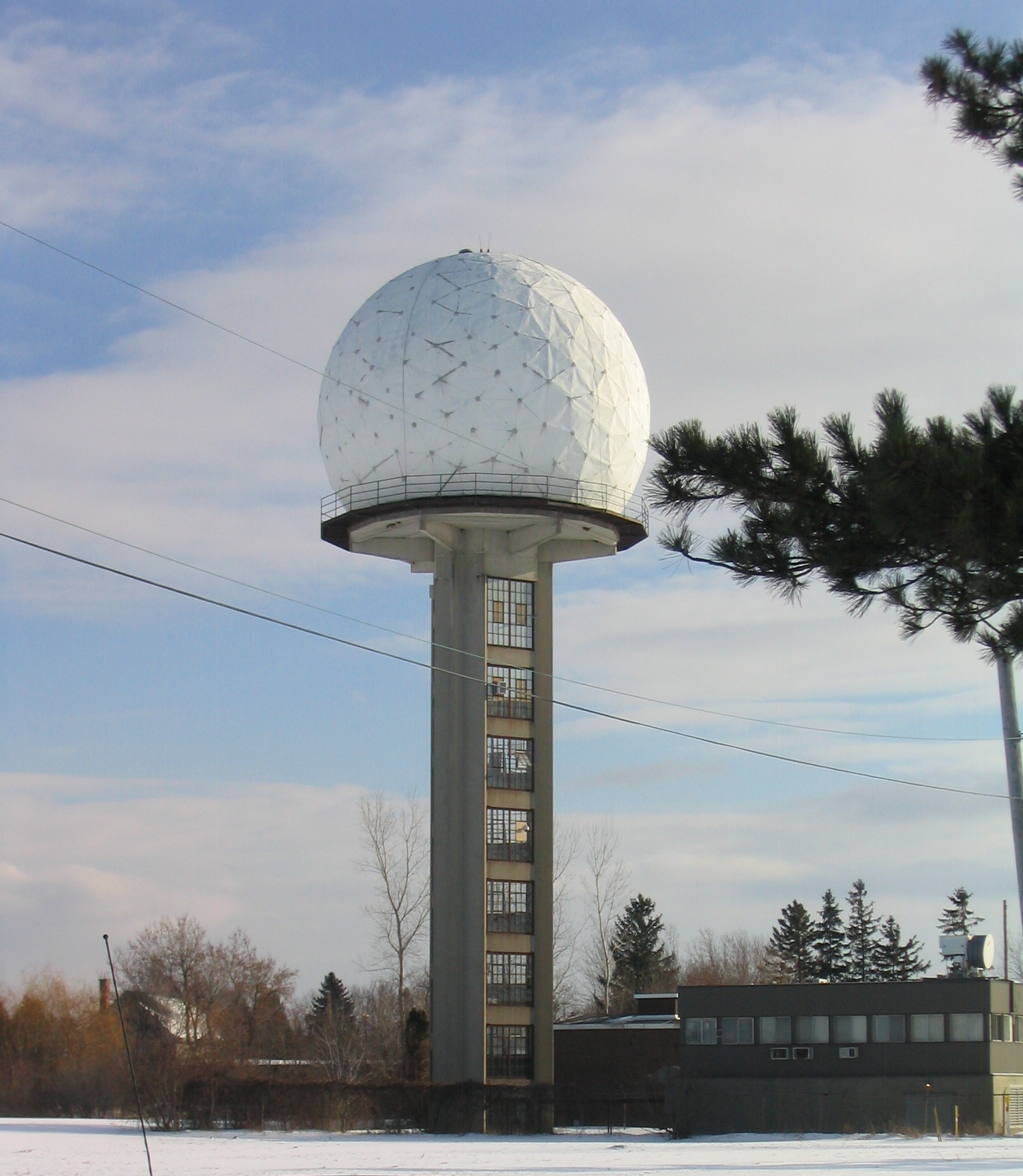
CWMN tower and radome

A 10 cm wavelength Doppler and dual-polarization radar built in 1968 and used for weather surveillance around the Montreal, Quebec area. It was part of the Canadian weather radar network, used by the local weather office to monitor weather in real time for a variety of applications, from severe weather detection to sewer flow forecasting. It was replaced by a new S-Band radar, owned by the Meteorological Service of Canada and situated in Blainville, Quebec, on October 1, 2018. The radar in McGill has been only available occasionally for research purpose thereafter.

Characteristics:

- Its ICAO calling identifier is CWMN.
- Its coordinates are 45°25′26.76″N 73°56′14.64″W, at 50 m above sea level.
- It has a large 9 meters (30 feet) diameter antenna transmitting impulses from a klystron.
- Its tower is 25 m high.
- It scans the atmosphere on 24 angles from 0.5 to 34.4 degrees above the horizon in 5 minutes.
- It was originally recording only reflectivities, giving position and intensity of precipitation. In 1992, it was upgraded to treat Doppler data and thus estimate the motion of the drops. It was upgraded again in 1999 with a dual polarization capability which allows direct identification of the type of precipitation (rain, snow, hail, etc...).

As it is a research as well as an operational radar, the large amount of data accumulated is studied for further development in radar hardware and software capabilities. The data are correlated with the other instruments in related research.

== Other instruments ==
Many other devices are operated by the MRO at the site or in other locations. These varies according to the research interests pursued. Some of them are or have been:

- UHF Wind profiler
- Bistatic radars
- X-band (3 centimeter wavelength) vertical pointing radar
- Ceilometer
