= J. Stewart Marshall =

Canadian physicist and meteorologist

- Born: 18 July 1911; Welland
- Died: 20 March 1992 (aged 80); Montreal
- Alma mater: Queen's University at Kingston; University of Cambridge
- Occupation: Physicist; professor
- Employer: McGill University; National Research Council Canada
- Awards: Patterson Medal (1961)

John Stewart Marshall (18 July 1911 – 20 March 1992) was a Canadian physicist and meteorologist. Researcher for the Canadian government during the Second World war and then professor at McGill University from 1945 until his retirement in 1979, he was renowned for his research in cloud physics and precipitation, but especially for being a pioneer of weather radar.

== Biography ==
=== Early life ===
Stewart Marshall was born on July 18, 1911, in Welland, Ontario, Canada. He attended Queen's University in Kingston where he earned his bachelor's degree in Physics and Mathematics in 1931, and then a master's degree in 1933 with a dissertation on scattering of electrons by metallic foils. After pausing to cure tuberculosis, he entered Cambridge University on a scholarship to study nuclear physics.

=== Second World War ===
Marshall was recalled to Canada in 1939 to join the National Research Council of Canada in Ottawa and participate in the war effort. In Canada, he first worked on ballistics problems, then on experiments with a brand new invention, the radar. He was among the first to recognize that an artifact that sometimes obscured ships and planes on radar data was caused by rain and snow. In 1943, Marshall underwent thoracic surgery to fight a reappearance of tuberculosis and then took the lead of the "Stormy Weather" project by the Canadian Department of National Defense whose purpose was to find a use for these parasitic echoes. The analysis of precipitation backscatter properties made it obvious that the undesirable interference provided a new way to observe the atmosphere.

=== Career at McGill ===
Just after the war, Marshall and R. H. Douglas formed the "Stormy Weather Group" at McGill University and continued their work. Different instruments were used by the group in research on the fundamental properties of precipitation. They were mounted at Dawson College, just south of the university's main campus.

In the mid-1950s, the Stormy Weather Group's contribution included the study of cloud physics, radar precipitation echo properties, early radar application to storm surveys, and precipitation monitoring at wider scale. Some of the topics closely associated with Marshall are the raindrop size distribution, the study of the snow virga slope, radar signal fluctuation, coalescence and radar displays like CAPPI and HARPI. In 1968, the need for a more permanent radar led to the construction of the current observatory, which was named the J. S. Marshall Radar Observatory a little later in honor of the founder of the research group.

At the same time Marshall was leading the research group, he was a professor of physics and meteorology at McGill University. The activities of the "Stormy Weather Group" attracted more and more graduates and, in large part, enabled the formation of the full-fledged meteorological department in 1959, the first in Canada. As director and founder, Stewart Marshall has profoundly influenced the teaching of meteorology, his department serving as a model for the creation of half a dozen programs across Canada.

=== Dissemination of knowledge ===
Marshall and R. C. Langille, a colleague from Ottawa, were the only Canadians to attend the first radar meteorology conference at the Massachusetts Institute of Technology (MIT) in 1947. He organized the third conference at McGill in 1952 with two of his first PhD students: Walter Hitschfeld and Kenrick Gunn. Marshall also organized the 11th conference in Boulder in 1964, co-sponsored by the American Meteorological Society (AMS) and the International Union of Radio Science (IURS), and the 13th conference in 1968, again in Montreal.

== Recognition ==
Stewart Marshall and his doctoral student, Walter Palmer, became famous for their work on the distribution of mid-latitude raindrops that led to the relationship between radar return (Z for reflectivity) and precipitation rate (R): the ZR relation.

Marshal has published many articles. He has served on numerous scientific and educational committees in Canada and the United States. He was a Fellow of the American Meteorological Society and served a term on the AMS Board from 1965 to 1967. He was elected a Fellow of the Royal Society of Canada in 1953.

He has received several awards:

- In 1961, the Patterson Medal of the Canadian Meteorological and Oceanographic Society
- In 1982, the Award for Outstanding Contribution to the Advance of Applied Meteorology by the AMS
- The Hugh Robert Mill Medal of the Royal Meteorological Society

== Also ==
=== Related articles ===
- J. S. Marshall Radar Observatory
- McGill Atmospheric and Oceanic Sciences

=== External links ===
- Works by or about J. Stewart Marshall at the Internet Archive
- "Papers of J. S. Marshall". American Meteorological Society.
