= HadGEM1 =

HadGEM1 (abbreviation for Hadley Centre Global Environmental Model, version 1) is a coupled climate model developed at the Met Office’s Hadley Centre in 2006 and used in IPCC Fourth Assessment Report on climate change. It represents a significant scientific advance on its predecessor, HadCM3. HadGEM1 also provides a basis for further development of models, particularly involving enhanced resolution and full Earth System modelling.

The current version is HadGEM3.
