= PRECIS =

http://precis.metoffice.com

PRECIS (Providing REgional Climates for Impacts Studies, pronounced pray-sea) is developed at the Hadley Centre at the UK Met Office, PRECIS is a regional climate modelling system designed to run on a Linux-based PC. PRECIS can be applied to any area of the globe to generate detailed climate change projections.

== Background ==
PRECIS is a regional climate model (RCM) ported to run on a Linux PC with a simple user interface, so that experiments can easily be set up over any region of the globe. PRECIS is designed for researchers (with a focus on developing countries) to construct high-resolution climate change scenarios for their region of interest. These scenarios can be used in impact, vulnerability and adaptation studies, and to aid in the preparation of National Communications, as required under Articles 4.1 and 4.8 of the United Nations Framework Convention on Climate Change (UNFCCC).

PRECIS has been developed at the Hadley Centre at the Met Office with funding from the UK Department for Environment, Food and Rural Affairs (DEFRA), the UK Department for International Development (DFID), the United Nations Development Programme (UNDP), the UK Foreign and Commonwealth Office (FCO) and the Department of Energy and Climate Change (DECC).

PRECIS is made available at workshops that are run regularly by Hadley Centre staff which are provided to address the many issues involved in its application. Support and follow up is provided through the PRECIS website and an email based help line.

== The model ==
PRECIS contains two regional climate models; HadRM3P and the HadRM3Q0 regional model used in the QUMP project. HadRM3P is a regional model based on the UK Met Office's HadCM3 General Circulation Model.

== PRECIS workshops ==
PRECIS is made available at workshops run regularly by Met Office Hadley Centre staff, generally in the region where it is to be used. Workshops are provided to give scientific and technical training necessary to use PRECIS and address the many issues involved in its application. There are generally three international and one UK based PRECIS workshops held each year.

PRECIS workshops have provided training covering over 100 countries and over 300 participants. The workshops have been successful in encouraging collaboration between PRECIS users in groups of countries.

== See also ==
- UK Met Office
- Hadley Centre for Climate Prediction and Research
- PP format (post processing format)
