= HadCM3 =

Coupled climate model

HadCM3 (abbreviation for Hadley Centre Coupled Model, version 3) is a coupled atmosphere-ocean general circulation model (AOGCM) developed at the Hadley Centre in the United Kingdom. It was one of the major models used in the IPCC Third Assessment Report in 2001.

Unlike earlier AOGCMs at the Hadley Centre and elsewhere (including its predecessor HadCM2), HadCM3 does not need flux adjustment (additional "artificial" heat and freshwater fluxes at the ocean surface) to produce a good simulation. The higher ocean resolution of HadCM3 is a major factor in this; other factors include a good match between the atmospheric and oceanic components; and an improved ocean mixing scheme (Gent and McWilliams). HadCM3 has been run to produce simulations for periods of over a thousand years, showing little drift in its surface climate.

HadCM3 is composed of two components: the atmospheric model HadAM3 and the ocean model HadOM3 (which includes a sea ice model). Simulations use a 360-day calendar, where each month is 30 days.

== Atmosphere model (HadAM3) ==
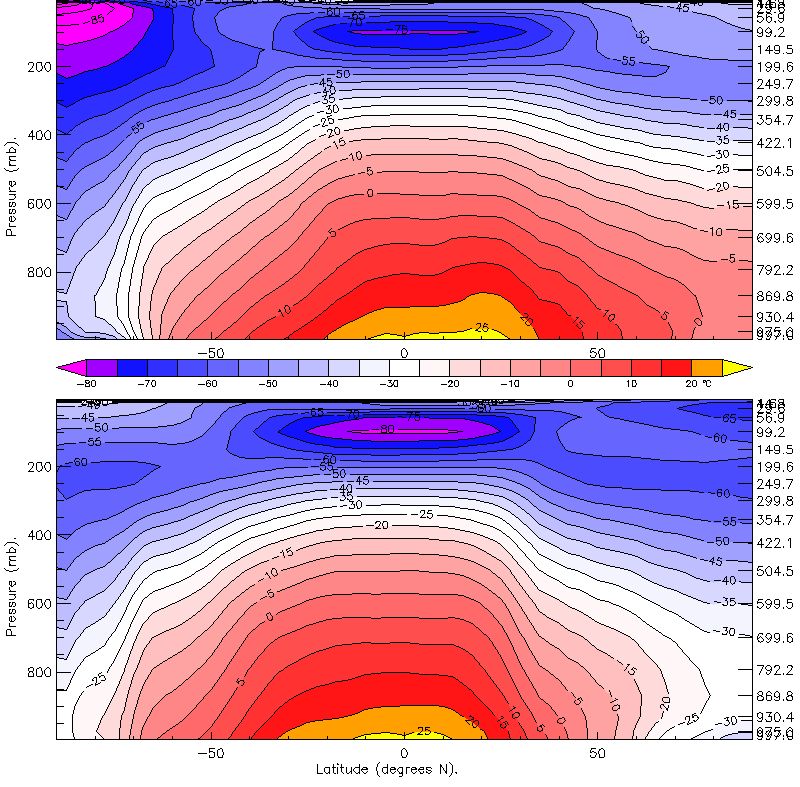
Zonal mean temperatures in JJA (top) and DJF (bottom)

HadAM3 is a grid point model that has a horizontal resolution of 3.75 × 2.5 degrees in longitude × latitude. This corresponds to a spacing between points of approximately 300 km and is roughly comparable to T42 truncation in a spectral model. There are 96 × 73 grid points on the scalar (pressure, temperature and moisture) grid; the vector (wind velocity) grid is offset by 1/2 a grid box (see Arakawa B-grid). There are 19 levels in the vertical using a hybrid (sigma and pressure) coordinate system.

The timestep is 30 minutes (with three sub-timesteps per timestep in the dynamics). Near the poles, fields are fourier-filtered to prevent instabilities due to the CFL criterion.

This is the model behind PRECIS (Providing Regional Climates for Impacts Studies) as well as being the atmosphere component of the distributed computing project Climateprediction.net.

== Ocean model (HadOM3) ==
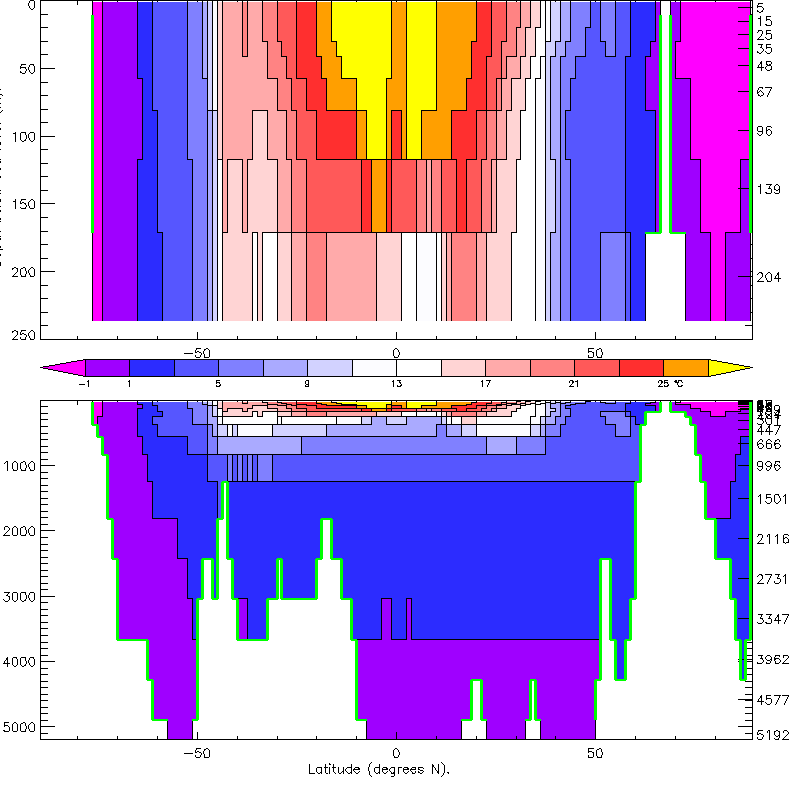
Ocean temperatures

The ocean model has a resolution of 1.25 × 1.25 degrees, 20 levels, and a timestep of one hour. Thus there are six ocean grid points for every atmospheric one. For ease of coupling the two models the grids are aligned and the ocean coastline is forced to be aligned to the atmospheric grid.

== Coupling ==
The atmospheric model is run for a day, and the fluxes (of heat, moisture and momentum) at the atmosphere-ocean interface are accumulated. Then the ocean model is run for a day, with the reverse fluxes accumulated. This then repeats through the length of the run. Unlike its predecessor HadCM2 there is no need for flux correction—the model climate remains stable and does not significantly drift. The lack of flux correction is cited by the IPCC as one of the advances in modelling since the IPCC Second Assessment Report.

The ocean model incorporates a thermodynamic-dynamic sea ice model with primitive (ocean drift) dynamics.

== Slab model (HadSM3) ==
The atmospheric model may be run coupled to a simpler "slab ocean" rather than the full dynamic ocean. This is faster (and requires less memory) than the full model, but lacks dynamical feedbacks from the ocean, which are incorporated into the full coupled ocean–atmosphere models used to make projections of climate change out to 2100. The slab model needs a calibration phase in which the ocean temperatures are held to climatology while it calculates the "flux correction", i.e., extra ocean-atmosphere fluxes needed to keep the model ocean in balance (the model ocean does not include currents; these fluxes to some extent replace the heat that would be transported by the missing currents). After this calibration period the model may be run in climate mode.

== See also ==
- Climateprediction.net
- Attribution of recent climate change
- Earth Simulator
- NCAR
- EdGCM
