= Met Office Hadley Centre =

British climate research institute

The Met Office Hadley Centre — named in honour of George Hadley — is one of the United Kingdom's leading centres for the study of scientific issues associated with climate change. It is part of, and based at, the headquarters of the Met Office in Exeter.

== Foundation ==
The Hadley Centre was founded in 1990, having been approved by the then British Prime Minister Margaret Thatcher and was first named the Hadley Centre for Climate Prediction and Research but subsequently renamed on various occasions.

== Major aims ==
The centre has several major aims:

- To understand processes within the climate system
- To develop state-of-the-art climate models for simulating climate variability and change
- To monitor global and national climate
- To predict seasonal to decadal variability of climate
- To predict long term climate change

The 30th anniversary of the Hadley Centre was celebrated in 2020.

The Met Office employs over 1900 staff, with approximately 200 working in its climate research division. Most of its funding comes from contracts with the Department for Energy Security and Net Zero (DESNZ), Department for Environment, Food and Rural Affairs (DEFRA), other United Kingdom Government departments, the Copernicus Climate Change Service and the European Commission. It also works closely with the Intergovernmental Panel on Climate Change (IPCC) providing worldwide climate forecasting and predictions.

The climate model (HadGEM) developed by the centre is used for climate change research purposes across the world. It covers both Ocean Modelling and Atmospheric Modelling at high spatial resolution..

== Research projects based on Hadley Centre climate models ==
The UK Climate Prediction Project uses the Hadley Centre climate model projections of future UK climate to inform UK government policy.

The Australian Bureau of Meteorology and the Korean Meteorological Agency use the Hadley Centre GloSea5 system for long range prediction.

The volunteer computing project ClimatePrediction.net is a research team based at the University of Oxford conducting research into global climate change using adapted versions of the climate models developed at the Hadley Centre. Individuals can participate in the research efforts by donating spare computer resources to aid their research.

The PRECIS (Providing Regional Climates for Impacts Studies) project enables scientists from the around the globe to run a regional climate model towards carrying out research into climate change.
