= George Pollard Jr. =

American whaler captain (1791–1870)

- Born: c. 1791
- Died: 1870 (aged 78–79)

George Pollard Jr. (c. 1791–1870) was the captain of the whalers Essex and Two Brothers, both of which sank. Following both events, he became a night watchman in his town of Nantucket, Massachusetts. Pollard's life, including his encounter with the sperm whale that sank Essex, likely served as inspiration for Captain Ahab, the whale-obsessed character in Herman Melville's Moby-Dick. Pollard also appears as a character in Melville's Clarel. Various books and films have been created that explain the experiences of Pollard and his crews.

== Early life ==
George Pollard Jr. was born in Nantucket, Massachusetts, the son of Tamar Pollard (née Bunker) and George Pollard, a ship's captain, at a time when the principal industry there was hunting sperm whales to harvest the oil contained in their blubber and spermaceti. Little is known about his childhood and teenage years. According to psychiatrist Lloyd Vernon Briggs, Pollard was an officer on the North River, captained by Robert Fulton. Emeritus president of the Melville Society Thomas Farel Heffernan explains that Pollard would have been around sixteen years old at the time and would not have been an officer. He further states that no records indicate that Pollard was on the ship and calls Briggs' claim "unconvincing". Psychiatrist Thomas E. Allen states that Pollard had been whaling since age fourteen. A non-practicing Quaker, Pollard married nineteen-year-old Mary C. Riddell in the Second Congregational Church on June 17, 1819. They had no children.

== Essex ==
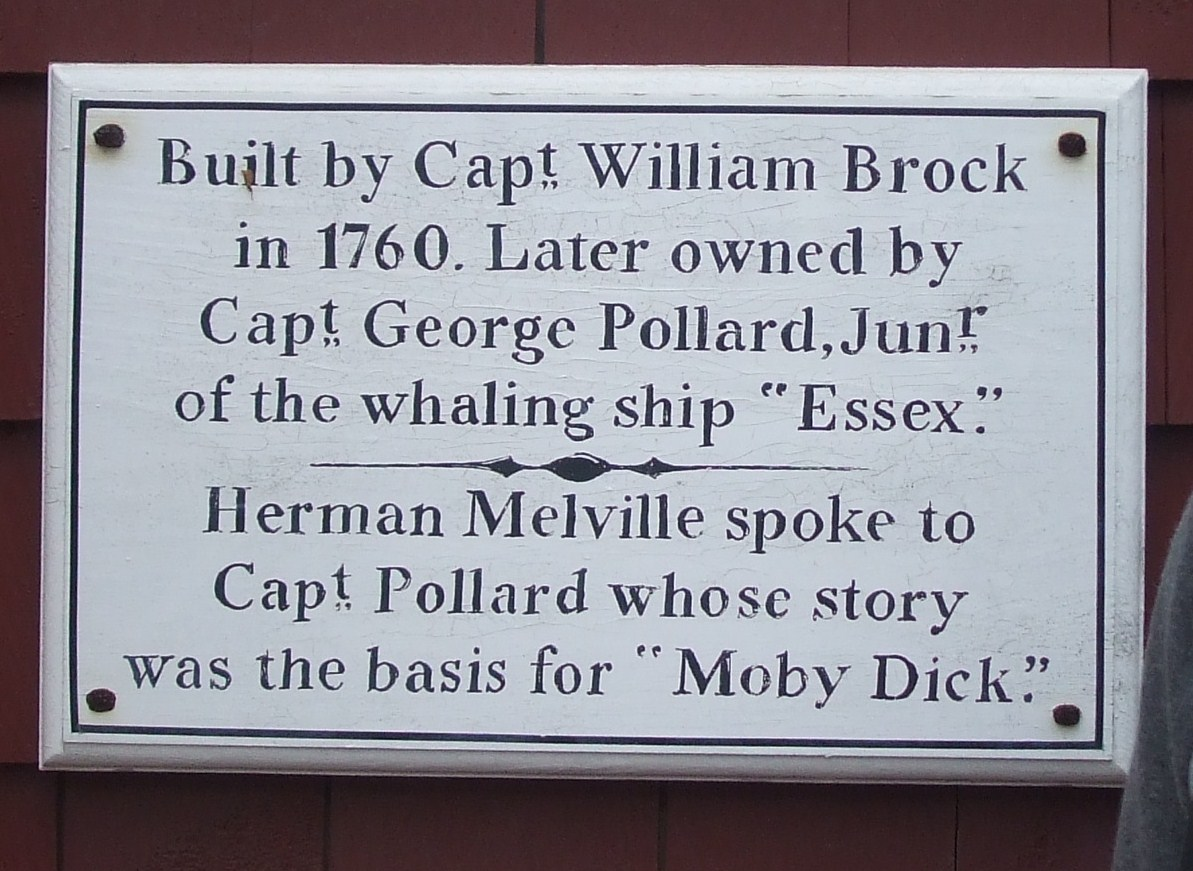
Plaque on the Capt. George Pollard house in Nantucket

George Pollard served on the Essex for four years in the capacities of second mate and first mate from 1815–1819. On April 5, 1819, Pollard was appointed captain of Essex by the owners, Gideon Folger and Paul Macy, when the previous captain, Daniel Russell, was promoted. The ship set sail for the Pacific Ocean on August 12, 1819, from which it was to return to Nantucket with a load of whale oil. Other members of the 21-man crew included Owen Chase as first mate, Matthew Joy as second mate, Thomas Nickerson as cabin boy, and six other Nantucket men. Those included Pollard's seventeen-year-old cousin Owen Coffin with whose care and protection Pollard had been entrusted by his aunt, Nancy Bunker Coffin. To fill in the crew, others had to be recruited from Cape Cod and New England cities; these were inexperienced seamen and were known as "green hands" by the Nantucketers.

Four days after leaving Nantucket, the ship was struck by a sudden storm and experienced a knockdown, where the ship tipped to its side by nearly ninety degrees. Two of the ship's whaleboats were lost and another was damaged, leaving two usable whaleboats. The knockdown was caused in part by miscalculations on the part of Pollard and his officers, and in part by the inexperience of the crew. In his personal account of the event Nickerson wrote that, once the ship was upright, "the cool and undismayed countenance of the captain soon brought all to their sober senses." Pollard declared the damage was so extensive that they should sail back to Nantucket for repairs, but Chase and Joy persuaded him to go forward to the Azores and replace the whaleboats there.

After a difficult passage around Cape Horn, the Essex arrived in the Pacific Ocean in January 1820. On November 20, 1820, in a remote area of the ocean, some 1,500 nautical miles (2,800 km) west of the Galapagos Islands, the Essex was struck twice by a huge sperm whale, estimated to be 85 feet (26 m) in length. With only three ship-keepers and the crew of Chase's whaleboat on board to repair their damaged vessel, the Essex began taking on water following the second collision with the whale. The crew abandoned the sinking vessel, taking the navigational equipment and Pollard's and Chase's sea chests with them. Meanwhile, Pollard and Joy were hunting smaller whales near the ship, and on their return found the Essex had capsized. The crew chopped off the masts, a necessary move that would enable the ship to stay upright for a longer time, and outfitted the whaleboats with sails and masts using the Essex's spars and sails.

They also hastened to retrieve what provisions they could and divided them equally so that each whaleboat had 200 pounds of hardtack, 65 gallons of freshwater, and some Galapagos tortoises. The crew was divided into three whaleboats commanded by Pollard, Chase, and Joy and set sail with provisions estimated to last them 60 days. Pollard, Chase, and Joy set up a council to decide which direction to sail in. The closest landfall was the Marquesas Islands, about 1,200 miles (1,900 km) west of their position, but the crew decided against this option due to the inhabitants' practice of cannibalism at the time. Pollard suggested sailing to the Society Islands, which were further away but presumed to be safer. However, on the grounds that very little was actually known about these islands, Chase and Joy disagreed, proposing instead to sail south far enough to pick up a band of variable breezes that would take them to South America. Once again, Pollard "reluctantly yielded to their arguments".

As they sailed, Pollard's whaleboat was attacked and damaged by a twelve-foot fish; those on the boat temporarily moved to Joy's and Chase's boats during repairs. On December 20, near starvation, the crews of the three whaleboats reached what they believed to be Ducie Island, but was actually Henderson Island, just 100 miles from Pitcairn where the residents lived comfortably. After seven days, they exhausted the island's meager supply of food and decided that the island could not sustain them. As such, they set sail again, hoping to reach Easter Island, about 850 miles away. Three of the men opted to remain on the island and were eventually rescued by the trading vessel Surry.

Sailing east towards South America, Pollard and Chase had seen Joy's health decline. He was transferred to Pollard's boat and shortly thereafter died. Obed Hendricks was given command of Joy's boat, and the three boats sailed on until during a gale one night Chase's boat became separated from the other two. By January 20, 1821, a crew member, Lawson Thomas, died just as the boats of Pollard and Hendricks had come to the end of their provisions. It was at this point that to survive their ordeal the men resorted to cannibalism at sea. As other crew members died, their bodies were eaten, until only four men were left alive on Pollard's boat. One of them, Charles Ramsdell, proposed that lots should be drawn to determine who should be killed so that the rest might survive.

Pollard at first resisted this suggestion but then gave in to the majority. The lot fell to his cousin Owen Coffin and lots were drawn again to determine who would be Coffin's executioner. Ramsdell drew the black spot and Coffin was shot and his remains eaten. After the death of Barzillai Ray five days later, Pollard and Ramsdell sailed on and were rescued on February 23 by the whaleship Dauphin. For a time the crews of Dauphin, Two Brothers, Hero, and Diana, which were all involved in the rescue of Pollard and Ramsdell, thought that Pollard and Ramsdell were the only survivors of the Essex crew. They were eventually moved to the whaleship Two Brothers and taken to Valparaíso. There, on March 17, they were reunited with Chase, Benjamin Lawrence, and Thomas Nickerson, the cabin boy of Essex, all of whom had been rescued by the British merchant ship Indian.

The majority of the surviving crew returned to Nantucket aboard Macedonian. Pollard, however, remained behind because his health was not stable enough for travel. Upon his return on August 5 aboard Two Brothers, Pollard had to face Nancy Bunker Coffin, who was distraught at the idea that her son's death resulted in Pollard's preservation. According to his nephew Joseph Warren Phinney, every year Pollard spent the anniversary of the Essex disaster fasting in solitude. He did so in memory of the survivors' reversion to cannibalism.

== Two Brothers and later years ==
Captain George Worth of the whaleship Two Brothers grew to admire Pollard, suggesting that Pollard replace him once he discontinued his own command of the ship. Pollard wanted to return to sea, believing that another wreck was unlikely. In November 1821, about two months after his return to Nantucket, Pollard left port as the captain of Two Brothers in hopes of finding success. Joining him as crew members were Nickerson and Ramsdell. Two Brothers and another ship, Martha, sailed to the Pacific at the same time so they could help each other in times of trouble. During the voyage, Pollard kept a supply of food in his cabin, something he had not done prior to the Essex disaster. This voyage also ended in disaster in February 1823 when, during a storm, Pollard had difficulty determining the ship's precise latitude while searching for Martha, which had disappeared from view. The ship ran into rocks off French Frigate Shoals and sank in less than twenty minutes. Initially Pollard did not jump ship, wanting instead to sink with it. At the time it was common for a captain to receive criticism if he returned home following a shipwreck. However, his crew persuaded him to escape, and they took refuge in the whaleboats before being rescued by the ship Martha within a short amount of time. Later they were transferred to the ship Pearl. Of the failed voyages Pollard said, "No owners will ever trust me with a whaler again, for all will say I am an unlucky man." Writer David O. Dowling suggests that, based on narratives by Eben Gardner—one of the mates of Two Brothers—and Nickerson, Pollard felt that he lacked the skills to be a whaling captain.

This second disaster ended Pollard's whaling career, and he later served as captain for a merchant ship before spending the rest of his life as a night watchman on Nantucket. As night watchman, Pollard made sure the town curfew was kept. Though it was a lowly job, he was reported to have been "buoyant, even cheerful". Meanwhile, some Nantucket villagers suspected that Pollard had drawn the lot to be executed and that an already-dying Coffin volunteered in his stead. Pollard died on February 1, 1870.

== Accounts and popular culture ==
First mate Chase and a ghostwriter wrote an account of the ordeal entitled Narrative of the Most Extraordinary and Distressing Shipwreck of the Whale-Ship Essex. This was published soon after the return of the survivors, and was an inspiration for the Herman Melville classic, Moby-Dick (1851). Much later, Cabin boy Nickerson wrote his own account of the voyage: The Loss of the Ship Essex Sunk by a Whale and the Ordeal of the Crew in Open Boats. His manuscript was lost for nearly a century, but was discovered in 1980 and authenticated and published in 1984. Nickerson also wrote a poem entitled "The Ship Two Brothers", hoping to establish Pollard as a hero figure for returning to sea after the Essex disaster. Heffernan calls Pollard's narrative of the Essex shipwreck the second "most important" after Owen Chase's. Pollard's narrative was recorded by London Missionary Society member George Bennet, who interviewed Pollard. Both Bennet and Pollard were passengers on the ship Pearl two months into Pollard's second rescue. According to Herman Melville, Pollard himself composed an undiscovered account of the Essex voyage. An account of the Essex ordeal, using both Chase and Nickerson's works, was written by Nathaniel Philbrick in the 2000 nonfiction book, In the Heart of the Sea: The Tragedy of the Whaleship Essex.

The source material for Moby Dick found itself an inspiration for movie adaptations in the mid-2010s as two of them were released in quick succession, and in which George Pollard himself was a character. On December 22, 2013, the television movie The Whale was broadcast on BBC One, wherein an elderly Thomas Nickerson recounted the events of Essex. Pollard was played by Adam Rayner. In 2015, a film, In The Heart of the Sea, directed by Academy Award Winner Ron Howard, was released on December 11, and in which Pollard was portrayed by Benjamin Walker. A dramatized documentary titled Revenge of the Whale, was produced and broadcast on September 7, 2001, by NBC.

== Herman Melville ==
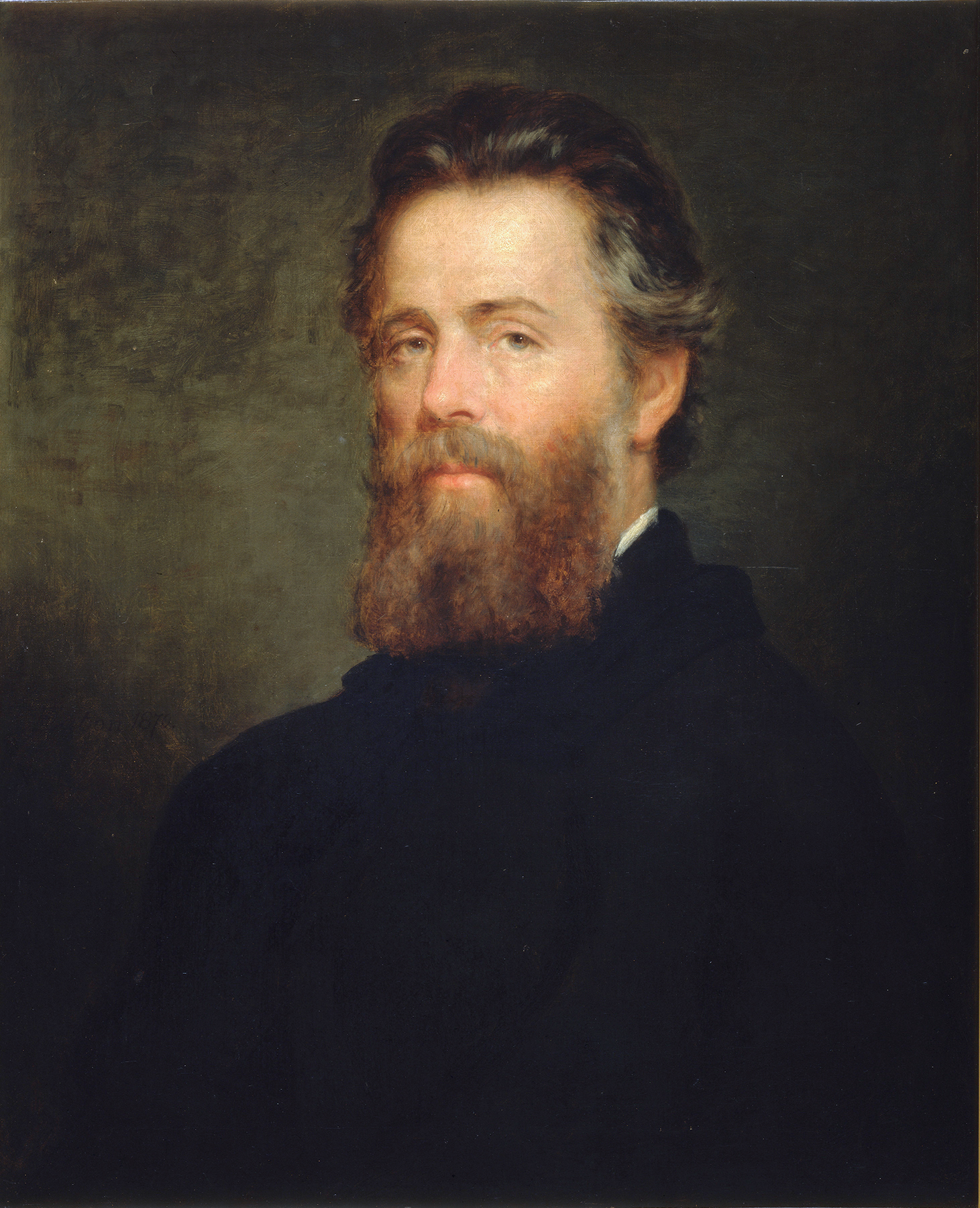
Herman Melville was inspired by Pollard for his stories.

Herman Melville took deep interest in Pollard's story. Melville both bases Moby Dick on the Essex story and retells it in one of the chapters, though he did not personally know Pollard while writing it. Pollard is considered by some people to be one of many inspirations for the character Captain Ahab in Melville's novel Moby Dick. In 2011 multiple websites ran claims that Pollard inspired Ahab. Others, however, stated that Ahab is not based on Pollard.

On July 8, 1852, Melville travelled to Nantucket and interviewed Pollard. Later John Hall, the second mate of the Acushnet, told Melville of Pollard's second shipwreck. Melville is quoted as having said of Pollard, "To the islanders he was a nobody. To me, the most impressive man, tho' wholly unassuming, even humble—that I ever encountered." Heffernan identifies various "Pollard figures" in Melville's work, suggesting that his meeting with Pollard influenced Melville's literary works beyond Moby Dick. Both Pollard and Chase inspired characters in Melville's Clarel: a Poem and a Pilgrimage in the Holy Land. Factual aspects of the poem are based on what he learned during his visit to Pollard, though he leaves out several parts of the Essex story. In the poem, Melville addresses both wrecks, but he reverses the order. Additionally, Pollard appears as the character Nehemiah. Heffernan compares Nehemiah to Bartleby in "Bartleby the Scrivener", saying that both of these "Pollard figures" have a similar self-will to Pollard.

== Bibliography ==
- Allen, Thomas E. (October 2009). "A Psychoanalytic Look at Herman Melville from his Use of Source Materials for Moby-Dick". The Psychoanalytic Review. 96 (5): 743–767. doi:10.1521/prev.2009.96.5.743. PMID 19842919.
- Chase, Owen (1981) [Account written in 1821]. "Narrative of the Most Extraordinary and Distressing Shipwreck of the Whale-Ship Essex". In Heffernan, Thomas Farel (ed.). Stove by a Whale: Owen Chase and the Essex. New York: Wesleyan University Press. ISBN 9780819562449. OCLC 12217894.
- Dewey, Colin (October 2017). "Surviving the Essex: The Afterlife of America's Most Storied Shipwreck by David O. Dowling, and: The Essex and the Whale: Melville's Leviathan Library and the Birth of Moby-Dick ed. by R. D. Madison (review)". Leviathan. 19 (3). Johns Hopkins University Press: 121–125. doi:10.1353/lvn.2017.0042 – via Project MUSE.
- Dowling, David O. (2016). Surviving the Essex: The Afterlife of America's Most Storied Shipwreck. Lebanon, New Hampshire: University Press of New England. ISBN 9781611689075.
- Heffernan, Thomas Farel (1981). Stove by a Whale: Owen Chase and the Essex. Wesleyan University Press. ISBN 0-8195-5052-3.
- Madison, R. D., ed. (2016). The Essex and the Whale: Melville's Leviathan Library and the Birth of Moby-Dick. Santa Barbara, California: Praeger. ISBN 978-1-4408-5007-3.
- Mathew, Roby (2021). "Mortal Combats from Classics to Contemporary: Archetypes in the Matrix of Melville's Nautical Fictional Combats" (PDF). Teresian Journal of English Studies. 13 (2): 34–40.
- Nickerson, Thomas (1984). Stackpole, Edouard A.; Chase, Helen Winslow (eds.). The Loss of the Ship Essex Sunk by a Whale and the Ordeal of the Crew in Open Boats. Nantucket, Massachusetts: Nantucket Historical Association. OCLC 11613950..
- Philbrick, Nathaniel (2001). In the Heart of the Sea: The Tragedy of the Whaleship Essex. New York: Penguin Books. ISBN 0-14-100182-8. OCLC 46949818.
- Pommer, Henry F. (November 1948). "Herman Melville and the Wake of the Essex". American Literature. 20 (3). Duke University Press: 290–304. doi:10.2307/2921576. JSTOR 2921576.
- Stackpole, Edouard A. (1984). "Aftermath". In Stackpole, Edouard A.; Chase, Helen Winslow (eds.). The Loss of the Ship Essex Sunk by a Whale and the Ordeal of the Crew in Open Boats. Nantucket, Massachusetts: Nantucket Historical Association. pp. 75–81. OCLC 11613950..
