= 1820 in literature =

This article contains information about the literary events and publications of 1820.

== Events ==
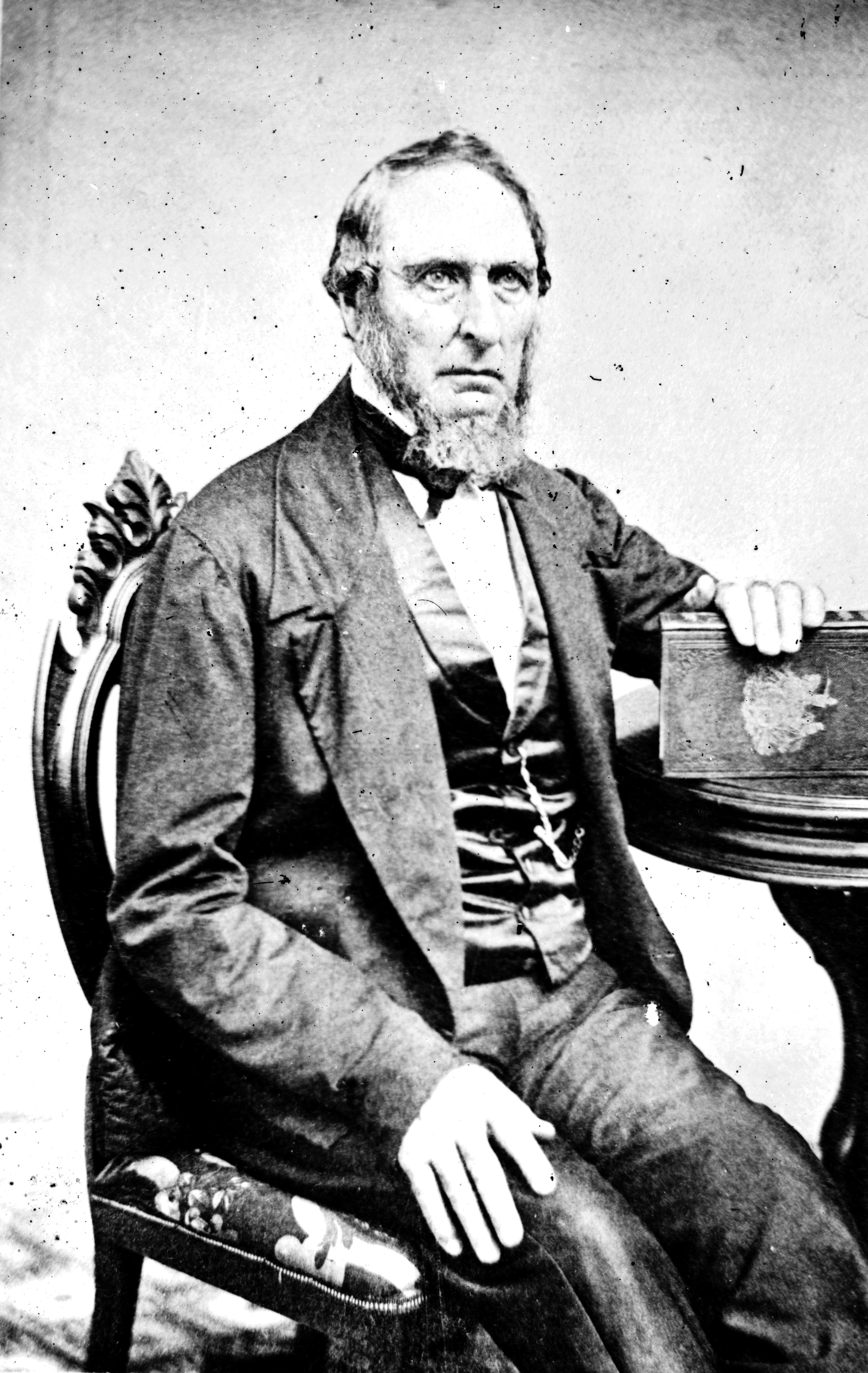
Owen Chase in later life

- January 16 – Poems Descriptive of Rural Life and Scenery by "Northamptonshire peasant poet" John Clare is published in England by John Taylor.
- April 22 – Walter Scott is created the 1st Scott baronet of Abbotsford in the County of Roxburgh in the Baronetage of the United Kingdom. The title became extinct in 1847, on the death of Sir Walter Scott, 2nd Baronet. He was the son of the original baronet, and he died without issue of his own.
- September – Poet John Keats, suffering from tuberculosis, leaves London to take up residence in the house on the Spanish Steps in Rome where he will die in 1821.At the suggestion of his doctors, Keats had agreed to move to Italy with his friend, the painter Joseph Severn. On 13 September, they left for Gravesend and four days later boarded the sailing brig Maria Crowther. On 1 October the ship landed at Lulworth Bay or Holworth Bay, where the two went ashore. Back on board the ship, Keats made the final revisions of "Bright Star".
- November 20 – An 80-ton sperm whale attacks the Essex, a whaleship from Nantucket, Massachusetts, 2,000 miles off the western coast of South America. The whale crushed the bow, driving the vessel backwards, and then finally disengaged its head from the shattered timbers and swam off, leaving Essex quickly going down by the bow. The first mate Owen Chase and the remaining sailors retrieved the spare whaleboat while the steward, William Bond, ran below to gather the captain's sea chest and whatever navigational aids he could find. The whaleboats of George Pollard Jr. and Matthew Joy were about 2 miles (3.2 km) from Essex when one of the boatsteerers looked back and saw the ship falling on her beam-ends. The two boats hurriedly released their whales and rowed back to Essex. The crew spent the next two days salvaging what supplies remained from the waterlogged wreck of the Essex. Three whaleboats were rigged with makeshift masts and sails taken from the Essex, and boards were added to heighten the gunwales and prevent large waves from spilling over the sides. On December 20, exactly one month after the whale attack, with the men suffering from starvation, dehydration and exposure, the boats landed on uninhabited Henderson Island, a small uplifted coral atoll within the modern-day British territory of the Pitcairn Islands. The men incorrectly believed that they had landed on Ducie Island, a similar atoll 220 miles (350 km) to the east. Had they landed on Pitcairn Island itself, 120 miles (190 km) to the southwest, they might have received help; the descendants of the survivors of HMS Bounty, who had mutinied in 1789, still lived there.Owen Chase, one of the eight survivors, recorded the events in his 1821 Narrative of the Most Extraordinary and Distressing Shipwreck of the Whale-Ship Essex. Herman Melville's 1851 novel Moby-Dick is in part inspired by this narrative.
- unknown dates
  - More than 20 years after the poet's death, Robert Chambers edits and publishes The Songs of Robert Burns.
  - Thomas Kendall has the first book printed in the Māori language, A korao no New Zealand; or, the New Zealander's first book; being an attempt to compose some lessons for the instruction of the natives, published in Sydney, Australia.
  - The first translation of the Old English epic poem Beowulf into a modern language, Danish, Bjovulfs Drape, by N. F. S. Grundtvig, is published.
  - The Cambridge Apostles, an intellectual discussion group, is established at the University of Cambridge in England.

== New books ==
=== Fiction ===
- James Fenimore Cooper – Precaution
- Thomas Gaspey – Forty Years Ago
- Robert Huish – Castle of Nielo
- Francis Lathom – Italian Mysteries
- Charles Maturin (anonymously) – Melmoth the Wanderer
- Regina Marie Roche – The Munster Cottage Boy
- Sir Walter Scott (anonymously)
  - Ivanhoe (published 1819, dated 1820)
  - The Abbot
  - The Monastery
- Louisa Stanhope – The Crusaders
- Rosalia St. Clair – The Highland Castle, and the Lowland Cottage

=== Children ===
- Maria Hack
  - English Stories, illustrating some of the most interesting events and characters between the Accession of Alfred and the Death of John
  - English Stories. Second series, between the Accession of Henry the Third and the Death of Henry the Sixth
- Mary Shelley – Maurice, or the Fisher's Cot (written 1820 then lost, published 1997)

=== Drama ===
- James Sheridan Knowles – Virginius
- Percy Bysshe Shelley – Prometheus Unbound
- George Soane – The Hebrew
- Charles Edward Walker – Wallace

=== Poetry ===
- Robert Burns (died 1796) – The Songs of Robert Burns
- John Clare – Poems Descriptive of Rural Life and Scenery
- John Keats
  - The Eve of St. Agnes
  - Lamia and Other Poems
- Alphonse de Lamartine – Méditations poétiques
- Adam Mickiewicz – Ode to Youth (Oda do młodości)
- Nguyễn Du – The Tale of Kieu (斷腸新聲, Truyện Kiều)
- Aleksandr Pushkin – Ruslan and Ludmila (Руслан и Людмила)
- Percy Bysshe Shelley – To a Skylark

=== Non-fiction ===
- Thomas Brown – Lectures on the Philosophy of the Human Mind
- Howard Douglas – A Treatise on Naval Gunnery
- Georg Wilhelm Friedrich Hegel – Elements of the Philosophy of Right
- John George Hoffman – Pow-Wows; or, Long Lost Friend
- Claude François Lallemand – Recherches anatomico-pathologiques sur l'encéphale et ses dépendances (to 1832)
- Charles Lamb – Essays of Elia (begin publication in The London Magazine)
- Thomas Malthus – Principles of Political Economy
- Charles Mills – History of the Crusades for the Recovery and Possession of the Holy Land
- Robert Southey – Life of Wesley
- Mariana Starke – Travels on the Continent: written for the use and particular information of travellers

== Births ==
- January 17 – Anne Brontë, English novelist and poet (died 1849)
- January 30 – Concepción Arenal, Spanish feminist writer and activist (died 1893)
- February 28 – John Tenniel, English illustrator and cartoonist (died 1914)
- March 2 – Multatuli (Eduard Douwes Dekker), Dutch writer (died 1887)
- March 17 – Jean Ingelow, English poet and novelist (died 1897)
- March 30 – Anna Sewell, English novelist (died 1878)
- April 4 – Mkrtich Khrimian, Armenian Catholicos, essayist and poet (died 1907)
- April 16 – Charlotte A. Jerauld, American poet and story writer (died 1845)
- April 26 – Alice Cary, American poet and short-story writer (died 1871)
- April 27 – Herbert Spencer, English philosopher (died 1903)
- June 21 – James Halliwell-Phillipps, English bibliophile (died 1889)
- August 13 – Sir George Grove, English writer and lexicographer on music (died 1900)
- September 2 – Lucretia Peabody Hale, American journalist and author (died 1900)
- September 17 – Émile Augier, French dramatist (died 1889)
- October 14 – John Harris, English poet (died 1884)
- November 23 (December 5 N.S.) – Afanasy Fet, Russian lyric poet, essayist and short-story writer (died 1892)
- November 28 – Friedrich Engels, German socialist writer (died 1895)

== Deaths ==
- February 5 – William Drennan, Irish poet, radical and educationalist (born 1754)
- February 23 – Alojzy Feliński, Polish poet (born 1771)
- March 20 – Eaton Stannard Barrett, Irish satirical poet and novelist (born 1786)
- April 2 – Thomas Brown, Scottish philosopher and poet (born 1778)
- May 1 – Richmal Mangnall, English schoolbook writer (born 1769)
- July 16 – William Hazlitt Sr., Irish writer, radical and Unitarian minister, father of William Hazlitt (born 1737)
- August 23 – Michel de Cubières, French poet, dramatist and historian (born 1752)
- September 16 – Nguyễn Du, Vietnamese poet (born 1766)
- October 5 – Augustin Barruel, French Jesuit priest and writer (born 1741)
- November 8 – Lavinia Stoddard, American poet and educationist (born 1787)
- November 12 – William Hayley, English poet and biographer (born 1745)
- Probable – Dionisie Eclesiarhul, Wallachian scribe, chronicler and illustrator (born c. 1740)

== Sources ==
- Philbrick, Nathaniel (2000). In the Heart of the Sea: The Tragedy of the Whaleship Essex. New York: Viking. ISBN 0-670-89157-6.
- Philbrick, Nathaniel (2001). In the Heart of the Sea: The Tragedy of the Whaleship Essex. New York: Penguin Books. ISBN 0-14-100182-8. OCLC 46949818.
