= The Whale (2013 film) =

2013 television film

- Genre: Drama
- Written by: Terry Cafolla
- Directed by: Alrick Riley
- Theme music composer: Debbie Wiseman
- Country of origin: United Kingdom
- Original language: English

Production
- Executive producer: Mick Kaczorowski(Animal Planet)
- Producer: Mike Dormer
- Cinematography: David Raedeker
- Editor: James Hughes
- Running time: 90 minutes
- Production companies: BBC Factual Productions; Animal Planet
- Budget: £2,213,684

Original release
- Network: BBC One; BBC One HD
- Release: 22 December 2013

The Whale is a British television film that was first broadcast on BBC One on 22 December 2013. Terry Cafolla wrote the film about the Essex incident in 1820, which also formed the basis of Herman Melville's 1851 novel Moby-Dick. The Whale was also broadcast on Animal Planet in the United States during the summer of 2014.

== Plot ==
Thomas Nickerson (Martin Sheen) recalls his past as a cabin boy on the Essex whaling ship.

== Cast ==
- Martin Sheen as old Thomas Nickerson
- Charles Furness as young Tom Nickerson
- Jonas Armstrong as Owen Chase
- Adam Rayner as Captain George Pollard
- Jolyon Coy as Benjamin Lawrence
- Jassa Ahluwalia as Owen Coffin
- David Gyasi as Richard Peterson
- John Boyega as William Bond
- Ferdinand Kingsley as Obed Hendricks
- Paul Kaye as Matthew Joy

== Production ==
The Whale used underwater shots and specialist equipment to create storm scenes for Essex, the whaleship the film is based on. The television film was made by BBC Factual Productions with Animal Planet as co-producer, with Eamon Hardy and Ruth Caleb as executive producers for the BBC and Mick Kaczorowski as executive producer for Animal Planet. The director is Alrick Riley and the composer is Debbie Wiseman. The producer is Mike Dormer.

Around the time of the first read-through of the script, Joe Armstrong left his role as Lawrence. The role was later given to Jolyon Coy who had recently finished the theatre show Posh. Filming began in Malta on 8 April 2013 and ended on 12 May 2013. In Malta, filming took place in Gozo and the Mediterranean Film Studios with the help of Latina Pictures. The set was visited by Emmanuel Mallia, Minister for Home Affairs for Malta, and Malta Film Commissioner Peter Busutill in May 2013. On 16 April 2013, the set was visited by Anton Refalo, the Minister for Gozo. Jassa Ahluwalia said re-recording took place on 11 October 2013. The production budget was £2,213,684.

On 25 November 2013, the BBC announced that the television film would be part of BBC One's Christmas schedule.

== Reception ==
Writing in The Guardian, John Crace said it "felt like a big-screen movie epic trapped inside a relatively small-budget TV programme" and was disappointed by the whale scenes. The Daily Telegraph's Michael Hogan gave it three out of five stars and called it "gripping and gory".

== See also ==
- In the Heart of the Sea (book)
- In the Heart of the Sea (film)
