= Owen Coffin =

American sailor (1802–1821)

- Born: August 24, 1802; Nantucket, Massachusetts, U.S.
- Died: February 6, 1821 (aged 18); Pacific Ocean
- Cause of death: Gunshot wound
- Resting place: Pacific Ocean (burial at sea)
- Occupation: Sailor
- Employer: Whailing ship Essex
- Relatives: Tristram Coffin, Sr; George Pollard, Jr. (cousin)

Owen Coffin (August 24, 1802 – February 6, 1821) was an American sailor aboard the Nantucket whaler Essex when it set sail for the Pacific Ocean on a sperm whale-hunting expedition in August 1819, under the command of his cousin, George Pollard, Jr. In November 1820, a bull sperm whale rammed and breached the hull of Essex in the mid-Pacific, causing Essex to sink. The crew escaped in small whaleboats, with sufficient supplies for two months, but were not rescued within that time. During January 1821, the near-starved survivors began to eat the bodies of those who had died. When even this resource ran out, the four men remaining in Pollard's boat agreed to draw straws to decide which of them should be killed, lest all four die of starvation. Coffin lost in the lottery, and was shot and eaten. The captain volunteered to take Coffin's place but Coffin refused, saying it was his "right" to do so that the others might live.

A son of Nancy (Bunker) and Hezekiah Coffin, Owen was a member of Nantucket's prominent Coffin whaling family.

== In popular culture ==
- The title song of the 1971 album Nantucket Sleighride by American rock band Mountain is titled in full "Nantucket Sleighride (To Owen Coffin)". While there is no evidence that the song is specifically about Coffin or the ship Essex (and the lyrics are in parts obscure in meaning), it is written from the point of view of a sailor on a ship undertaking a "three-year tour... on a search for the mighty sperm whale", and co-writer Felix Pappalardi, in an interview for the British music weekly Sounds (issue dated November 20, 1971), confirmed that the Owen Coffin in the dedication was the one from the Essex tragedy.
- German funeral doom metal band Ahab released The Divinity of Oceans, a concept album about Essex, and one song, Gnawing Bones (Coffin's Lot), directly references Coffin's fate.
- The story of the Essex is known to have greatly interested Herman Melville, who annotated a copy of Narrative of the Most Extraordinary and Distressing Shipwreck of the Whale-Ship Essex, an account of the shipwreck and its aftermath by the ship's surviving first mate, Owen Chase. The story inspired part of Melville's novel Moby-Dick.
- Owen Coffin was played by British actor Frank Dillane in the 2015 film adaptation of the story of the Essex, In the Heart of the Sea, directed by Ron Howard. In the film, the character was renamed as "Henry Coffin", presumably to avoid confusion with Owen Chase.
- Owen Coffin was played by Jassa Ahluwalia in the BBC film of the true story of the sinking of the whale ship Essex, entitled The Whale.

== See also ==
- Cannibalism at sea
- George Pollard Jr.
- In the Heart of the Sea (book)
- List of incidents of cannibalism
