= Leon Lewis =

Leon Lewis may refer to:

- Leon Lewis (writer) (1833–1920), American writer
- Leon L. Lewis (1888–1954), American attorney
- Bud Lewis (soccer) (Leon Lewis, born 1953), American soccer player
