= Herman Isham House =

Historic house in Massachusetts, United States

- U.S. National Register of Historic Places
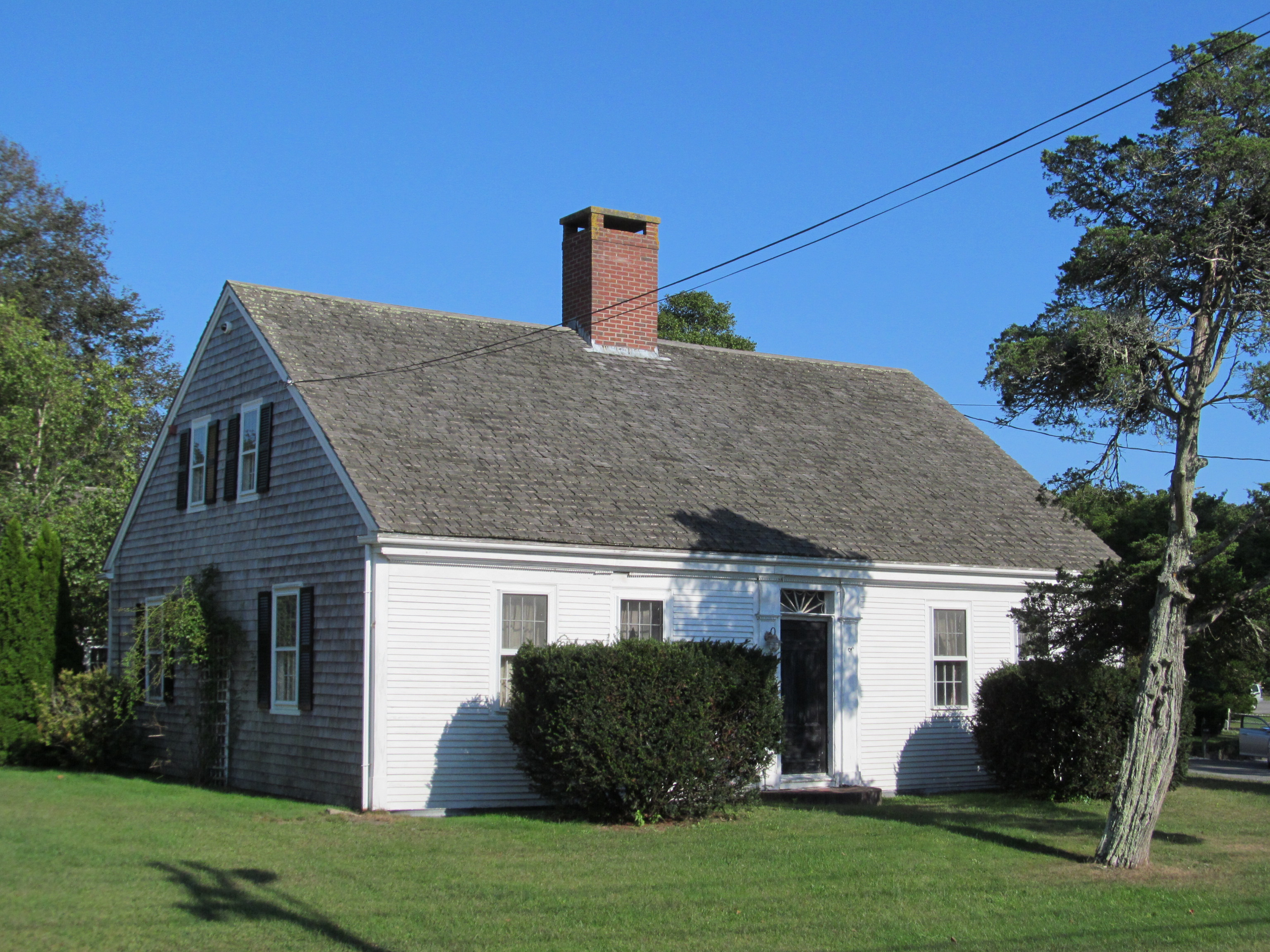
- Herman Isham House

- Location within Cape Cod Location within Massachusetts Location within the United States
- Location: 1340 Main Street, Barnstable, Massachusetts
- Coordinates: 41°38′27″N 70°23′34″W
- Area: 57 acres (23 ha)
- Built: 1747
- Architectural style: Georgian
- MPS: Barnstable MRA
- NRHP reference No.: 87000295
- Added to NRHP: March 13, 1987

The Herman Isham House is a historic house located in the Osterville area of Barnstable, Massachusetts.

== Description and history ==
The 1 1/2-story Cape house was built c. 1747, and is a well-preserved example of a Georgian cottage. It is five bays wide, with a detail central entry flanked by heavy pilasters and topped by a transom and console. The house was probably built by Samuel Isham, whose grandson sold it to Seth Weeks in 1841. Weeks was the last survivor of the famous whaler Essex, which a sperm whale rammed and sank. Herman Melville immortalized the story in his book Moby-Dick.

The house was listed on the National Register of Historic Places on March 13, 1987.

== See also ==
- National Register of Historic Places listings in Barnstable County, Massachusetts
