= Owen Chase =

American sailor (1797–1869)

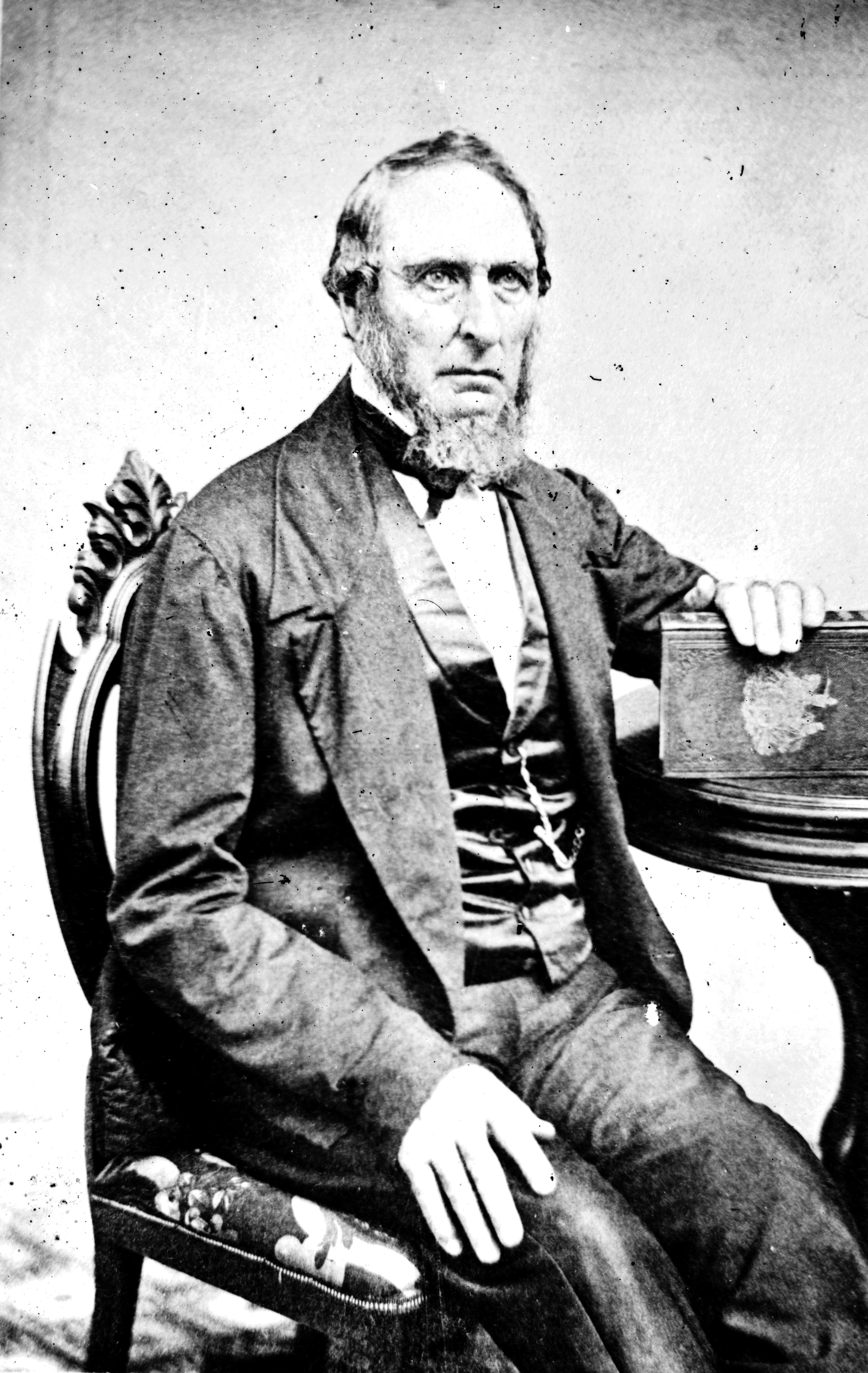
- Born: October 7, 1797; Nantucket, Massachusetts, U.S.
- Died: March 8, 1869 (aged 71); Nantucket, Massachusetts, U.S.
- Occupation: Whaling Captain
- Children: 5
- Writing career
- Genre: Non fiction

Owen Chase (October 7, 1797 – March 7, 1869) was first mate of the whaler Essex, which sank in the Pacific Ocean on November 20, 1820, after being rammed by a sperm whale. Soon after his return to Nantucket, Chase wrote an account of the shipwreck and the attempts of the crew to reach land in small boats. The book, Narrative of the Most Extraordinary and Distressing Shipwreck of the Whale-Ship Essex, was published in 1821 and would inspire Herman Melville to write Moby-Dick.

== Background ==
Chase was born in Nantucket, Massachusetts, the son of Phebe (Meader) and Judah Chase, a farmer. He was one of five surviving brothers, all of whom became whaling captains. In June 1817, on what was probably his second or third voyage, he sailed as a boatsteerer on Essex under captain Daniel Russell and first mate George Pollard Jr. His share of the profits from the successful whaling voyage enabled him to marry Peggy Gardner a few weeks after his return to Nantucket in the spring of 1819.

== Sinking of Essex ==
As first mate of Essex, 21-year-old Owen Chase left Nantucket on August 12, 1819, on a two-and-a-half-year whaling voyage. On the morning of November 20, 1820, a sperm whale (said to be around 85 feet; 26 m) twice rammed Essex, sinking her 2,000 nautical miles (3,700 km) west of South America. The closest known islands, the Marquesas, were more than 1,200 miles (1,900 km) to the west and the captain of Essex, George Pollard, intended to make for them but the crew, led by Chase, feared the islands might be inhabited by cannibals and voted to make for South America. Unable to sail against the trade winds, the boats had to sail south for 1,000 mi (1,600 km) before they could use the Westerlies to turn towards South America, which would still lie another 3,000 mi (4,800 km) to the east.

Of the 20 men in three whale boats who began the journey, eight survived: three who chose to remain on a barely habitable island and five in two boats who attempted to reach South America and who were forced to resort to cannibalism to remain alive.

== Return to Nantucket ==
Along with three other survivors of Essex, Chase returned to Nantucket on Eagle on June 11, 1821, to find he had a 14-month-old daughter he had never seen named Phoebe. An account of the homecoming was later published in a magazine. A large crowd had gathered at the docks to see the survivors arrive and as they disembarked, had parted without a sound. The survivors walked alone to their homes without a word being spoken.

Within four months and with the help of a ghostwriter, he completed an account of the disaster, the Narrative of the Most Extraordinary and Distressing Shipwreck of the Whale-Ship Essex; this was used by Herman Melville as one of the inspirations for his novel Moby-Dick.

== Return to the sea ==
In December 1821 Chase signed on as first mate on the whaler Florida which sailed on December 20 from New Bedford, Massachusetts; the crew list contains the only extant physical description of Chase: 24 years old, five feet 10 inches, dark complexioned and brown haired. After whaling in the same area where Essex sank, the vessel returned to New Bedford on November 26, 1823. Chase was again greeted by a daughter he had never seen, 18-month-old Lydia. On September 14, 1824, a son William was born and Chase's wife Peggy died two weeks later. Nine months later Chase married Nancy Joy, the widow of Matthew Joy who was the first of the Essex survivors to die.

Two months later Chase sailed again, as captain of the Winslow. The Winslow fished the Japan grounds before continuing east to dock briefly in San Francisco before sailing for the Pacific ground and finally returning to New Bedford on June 20, 1827. In mid-August Winslow set sail for the Brazil Banks, but was badly damaged in a severe storm south of the Canary Islands that also sank two whaling ships and damaged three more. (Note: The Brazil Banks are the edge of the continental shelf to the east and south of latitude 16°S of the coast of South America.) The ship was forced to return to New Bedford where it took nine months to repair. The ship sailed for the Pacific grounds in mid July 1828, returning early July 1830.

Relatively wealthy from his successful whaling voyages, Chase now stayed in Nantucket for two years to supervise the construction at the Brant Point shipyards of his own whaler, the Charles Carrol, which sailed on October 10, 1832, for a three-and-a-half-year voyage. Nine months into the voyage, Chase's wife gave birth to a daughter named Adeline. Nancy Chase died several weeks later. Chase's brother Joseph, captain of the Catherine, was told of the tragedy several months later and passed the news on to Chase when they met in the Pacific ground in August 1834. The Charles Carrol returned to Nantucket in March 1836

On April 5, Chase married Eunice Chadwick. In August, Chase departed on another three-and-a-half-year whaling voyage. Sixteen months later Eunice gave birth to Charles. Herman Melville wrote of the news in his copy of Chase's narrative:

"For, while I was in the Acushnet we heard from some whaleship that we spoke, that the captain of the "Charles Carrol" - that is Owen Chase - had recently received letters from home, informing him of the certain infidelity of his wife, the mother of several children, one of them being the lad of sixteen, whom I alluded to as giving me a copy of his father's narrative to read. We also heard that this receipt of this news had told most heavily upon Chase, & and that he was of the deepest gloom."

We know from the ship's log that Charles Carrol met the whaler Hero in the grounds, the captain of which was Reuben Joy, brother of Matthew Joy from Essex, and that the two vessels remained together for the unusually long time of two months. It is speculated that it was Joy who passed on the news to Chase. The Charles Carrol docked at Holmes Hole on February 15, 1840, where Chase left the ship and traveled to Nantucket. There he filed for divorce on February 18, which was granted on July 7.

== Retirement and death ==
Two months after the divorce was finalized, Chase married for the fourth and final time to Susan Coffin Chase. He never sailed again. Memories of the harrowing ordeal haunted Chase. He suffered terrible headaches and nightmares. Later in his life, Chase began hiding food in the attic of his Nantucket house on Orange Street and was eventually institutionalized in the Quaise Asylum. He remained there for an estimated 8 years and was subsequently released.

He died on March 7, 1869, and is buried in the New North Cemetery in Nantucket with two of his wives, Peggy and Nancy.

== Family ==
Chase was married four times:

- April 1819 to Peggy Gardner and had several children
- June 1825 to Nancy Joy a widow
- April 1836 to Eunice Chadwick
- Sept 1840 to Susan Gwinn or Quinn, a widow

== In popular culture ==
- The 1971 album Nantucket Sleighride, by the band Mountain, contains the song Nantucket Sleighride (to Owen Coffin), inspired by Chase's account of the Essex.
- In 2013, the television movie The Whale was broadcast on BBC One on December 22, 2013, wherein an elderly Thomas Nickerson, who had been the cabin boy on Essex, recounts the events. Chase was played by Jonas Armstrong.
- In 2015, the film In The Heart of the Sea, directed by Academy Award Winner Ron Howard, was released on December 11, 2015, with Chase being portrayed by Chris Hemsworth.
- A dramatized documentary, entitled Revenge of the Whale, had already been produced and broadcast on September 7, 2001, by NBC. The Chase character was voiced by actor David Harbour.

== See also ==
- Ann Alexander, a ship sunk by a whale on August 20, 1851
- In the Heart of the Sea: The Tragedy of the Whaleship Essex, a National Book Award-winning work of maritime history by Nathaniel Philbrick telling the Essex story from the point of view of both Nickerson and Chase.
- In the Heart of the Sea, the above book adapted into a feature film by director Ron Howard, starring Chris Hemsworth, Ben Whishaw, and Cillian Murphy.
