= Thomas Nickerson =

American sailor and author (1805–1883)

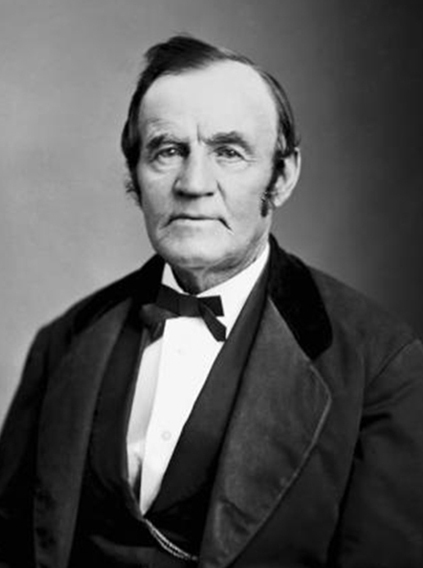
- Nickerson c. 1870
- Born: Thomas Gibson Nickerson; March 20, 1805; Harwich, Massachusetts, U.S.
- Died: February 7, 1883 (aged 77)
- Occupation: Sailor
- Known for: Crewmate of whaleship Essex
- Notable work: The Loss of the Ship "Essex" Sunk by a Whale and the Ordeal of the Crew in Open Boats

Thomas Gibson Nickerson (March 20, 1805 – February 7, 1883) was an American sailor and writer. In 1819, when he was fourteen years old, Nickerson served as cabin boy on the whaleship Essex. On this voyage, the ship was sunk by a whale, and the crew spent three months at sea before the survivors were rescued. In 1876 he wrote The Loss of the Ship "Essex", an account of the ordeal and of his subsequent experiences at sea. The manuscript was lost until 1960, and was first published in 1984.

== Overview ==
Nickerson was born in Harwich, Massachusetts, the son of Rebecca (Gibson) and Thomas Nickerson. His mother was from Nantucket while his father was from Cape Cod. Both his parents died before he was two years old, and he was raised by his grandparents on Nantucket. Nickerson made his first sea voyage in 1819, at the age of fourteen, on the ill-fated whaler Essex, which sailed from Nantucket Harbor. A whale rammed and sank Essex on November 20, 1820. The first mate, Owen Chase, later wrote about the incident in the Narrative of the Most Extraordinary and Distressing Shipwreck of the Whale-Ship Essex, a book that inspired Herman Melville to write Moby-Dick.

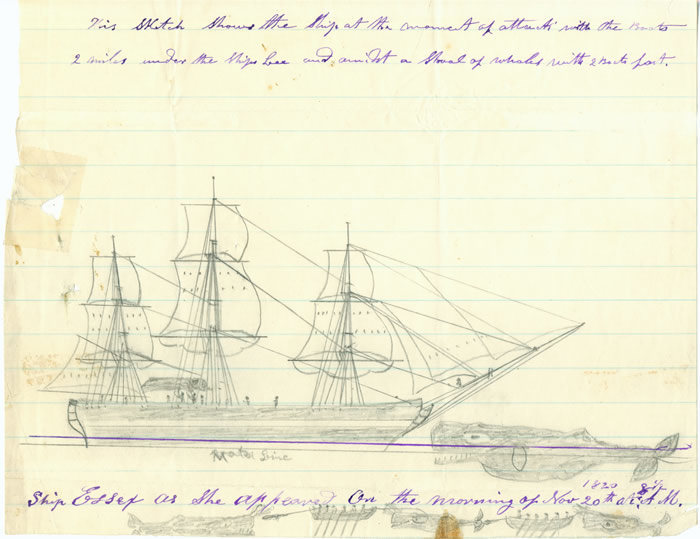
Essex being struck by a whale on November 20, 1820; sketched later in life by Thomas Nickerson

When Essex sank her crew took to three small boats and set off for the coast of South America. After a harrowing 89 days at sea, Nickerson and two companions were rescued by Indian. Nickerson returned to sea after his rescue, serving on other whale ships. He became a boatsteerer on the whaler Two Brothers, which was wrecked on 11 February 1823.

Nickerson eventually worked his way up to captain of a merchant vessel. Upon retiring he ran a boarding house in Nantucket, which was visited by the writer Leon Lewis, who encouraged him to write down his story of the three months he was lost at sea with the Essex survivors. Nickerson did this, and in 1876, he sent an 80-page manuscript, as well as accounts of other adventures he had later in life, to Lewis for editing. Lewis, however, never prepared the manuscript for publication and left it in a trunk in the care of Darius Ogden, a neighbor in Penn Yan, New York. Nickerson died in 1883, seven years after sending his manuscript to Lewis. The trunk containing the manuscript was inherited by Ogden's grandson, James Finch. The trunk's contents were finally inspected in 1960 and The Loss of the Ship "Essex" Sunk by a Whale and the Ordeal of the Crew in Open Boats was discovered. Finch's wife Ann, recognizing the manuscript's importance, contacted the Nantucket Historical Association. It took another twenty years before it was authenticated by Edouard A. Stackpole, a Nantucket whaling historian. The Finches donated the manuscript to the Association, who published an abridged version in 1984, a century after Nickerson's death.

== In popular culture ==
=== Books ===
- The 1851 novel, Moby-Dick or, The Whale by Herman Melville, which has been adapted several times for film, theatre and radio.
- In the Heart of the Sea: The Tragedy of the Whaleship Essex by Nathaniel Philbrick (2000) - partly based on Nickerson's account.

=== Movies ===
Nickerson's historical character was dramatized in three films:

- A 2001 dramatized documentary, entitled Revenge of the Whale, was produced and broadcast on September 7, 2001, by NBC, in which Thomas Nickerson was voiced by actor Jeffrey Carlson.
- In 2013, the television movie The Whale was broadcast on BBC One on December 22, wherein an elderly Thomas Nickerson recounted the events of Essex. The elder Nickerson was played by Martin Sheen, and the younger Nickerson by Charles Furness.
- In 2015, the theatrical film In the Heart of the Sea was released, directed by Ron Howard. The older Thomas Nickerson is portrayed by Brendan Gleeson and the young Nickerson is played by Tom Holland.
