= In the Heart of the Sea (film) =

2015 film by Ron Howard

- Theatrical release poster
- Directed by: Ron Howard
- Screenplay by: Charles Leavitt
- Story by: Charles Leavitt; Rick Jaffa Amanda Silver
- Based on: In the Heart of the Sea: The Tragedy of the Whaleship Essex by Nathaniel Philbrick
- Produced by: Brian Grazer; Ron Howard; Will Ward; Joe Roth; Paula Weinstein
- Starring: Chris Hemsworth; Benjamin Walker; Cillian Murphy; Tom Holland; Ben Whishaw; Brendan Gleeson
- Cinematography: Anthony Dod Mantle
- Edited by: Dan Hanley; Mike Hill
- Music by: Roque Baños
- Production companies: Village Roadshow Pictures; Roth Films; Imagine Entertainment; RatPac-Dune Entertainment; COTT Productions; Enelmar Productions A.I.E.; Spring Creek Pictures; Kia Jam
- Distributed by: Warner Bros. Pictures
- Release dates: December 7, 2015 (New York City); December 11, 2015 (United States)
- Running time: 122 minutes
- Countries: United States; Spain
- Languages: English; Spanish
- Budget: $100 million
- Box office: $94.3 million

In the Heart of the Sea is a 2015 historical adventure drama film directed and co-produced by Ron Howard from a screenplay by Charles Leavitt and a story by Leavitt, Rick Jaffa, and Amanda Silver. An international co-production between the United States and Spain, the film stars Chris Hemsworth, Benjamin Walker, Cillian Murphy, Tom Holland, Ben Whishaw, and Brendan Gleeson. It is based on Nathaniel Philbrick's 2000 non-fiction book In the Heart of the Sea: The Tragedy of the Whaleship Essex, about the sinking of the American whaling ship Essex in 1820, an event that in part inspired Herman Melville's 1851 novel Moby-Dick.

The film premiered in New York City on December 7, 2015, and was released in theaters in the United States on December 11, 2015, by Warner Bros. Pictures. In the Heart of the Sea received mixed reviews from critics and was a box-office failure, grossing only $94.3 million against a $100 million budget.

== Plot ==
In 1850, author Herman Melville visits innkeeper Thomas Nickerson, the last survivor of the sunk whaleship Essex, offering money for his story. Nickerson initially refuses, then agrees after his wife intervenes.

In 1820, a Nantucket whaling company has refitted the Essex for a whale hunt to bring back lucrative whale oil; 14-year-old Nickerson joins as a cabin boy. Veteran whaler Owen Chase is hired as first mate, though he is disappointed not to receive a captain's commission. Captain George Pollard is an inexperienced mariner who envies Chase's skill and popularity. They clash, and Pollard sails into a storm against Chase's advice. They agree to put their differences aside and soon the crew kills their first bull sperm whale.

Three months pass without success, and Pollard realizes that the Atlantic Ocean holds no sighting of whales. The Essex rounds Cape Horn to the Pacific, hoping for better luck. In Atacames, Ecuador, a Spanish captain tells them of the bountiful "Offshore Grounds" 2,000 miles to the west, but says a vengeful "white whale" destroyed his ship, killing six of his men. Undaunted, Pollard and Chase lead the expedition west. They find the grounds, but when they launch the whaling boats, a massive bull sperm whale with white, scarred skin damages the boats and turns on the ship.

Chase harpoons it from the Essex deck, but the whale rams the hull, killing two men. The crew abandons the sinking Essex in three whaling boats, and must sail hundreds of miles to shore with limited supplies. The whale attacks again and they escape to the tiny Henderson Island. Chase discovers long-dead skeletons of earlier castaways, and the crew fears they might also die waiting for rescue. Four men stay while the rest set sail hoping to find better lands.

The three boats are separated and one is lost. In one of the three boats that left Henderson Island, one of the sailors dies, and the others reluctantly decide to cannibalise him. Nickerson stops his retelling of his story, overcome with remorse for his cannibalism and believing his wife could not love him after hearing of it. She has been eavesdropping, however, and reassures him she still loves him. Comforted, he continues his story.

The men in the second remaining boat also resort to cannibalism and resort to drawing straws to decide who will sacrificed. Though Pollard is chosen, his cousin Owen Coffin turns the pistol on himself. After the boats are reunited, the white whale returns, and Chase takes position to attack. When the white whale breaches, Chase sees his previously thrown harpoon still embedded above the white whale's eye. Chase stares into the white whale's eye as the whale stares back. Chase lowers his harpoon and the white whale swims away, never to be seen again.

The two boats become separated. Pollard's boat is rescued by a passing ship, but Chase's continues to drift. With the survivors on the verge of death, they reach Chile's Alejandro Selkirk Island. They are fed, clothed, and make their way back to Nantucket, where they reunite with their families.

The ships' owners ask Pollard and Chase to cover up the story of a whale destroying the ship, to protect the industry's reputation. Chase, having had enough of their dishonesty, refuses and resigns. Although initially loyal to the owners, Pollard later reveals the truth in the inquiry, much to the owners' anger. Nickerson relates that a ship was sent to Henderson Island to rescue the men there; three were still alive. Chase continued sailing and became a merchant captain. Pollard led another expedition to find and kill the white whale, but never found it. His ship ran aground off the Hawaiian Islands and he was forced to retire. Melville promises Nickerson that his novel will be fiction, without all the details that had been shared with him. He departs to compose his novel, Moby-Dick, beginning by writing its first line: "Call me Ishmael".

== Cast ==
- Chris Hemsworth as Owen Chase, the first mate
- Benjamin Walker as George Pollard Jr., the captain
- Cillian Murphy as Matthew Joy, the second mate
- Tom Holland as Thomas Nickerson, the cabin boy

- Brendan Gleeson as Old Thomas Nickerson

- Ben Whishaw as Herman Melville
- Michelle Fairley as Mrs. Nickerson
- Gary Beadle as William Bond, the captain's steward
- Frank Dillane as Henry Coffin (based on Owen Coffin), Pollard's cousin
- Edward Ashley as Barzillai Ray
- Jordi Mollà as Spanish Sailor
- Charlotte Riley as Peggy Chase
- Donald Sumpter as Paul Mason
- Jamie Sives as Isaac Cole
- Joseph Mawle as Benjamin Lawrence
- Paul Anderson as Caleb Chappel (based on Thomas Chappel)
- Luca Tosi as William Wright
- Sam Keeley as Ramsdell

== Production ==
The film was in development back in 2000, with Barry Levinson set to direct for Miramax Films and Intermedia. Leavitt finished writing the script in 2004. In 2009, the film moved to New Regency, with Edward Zwick attached to direct. Zwick also provided rewrites with producing partner Marshall Herskovitz.

=== Casting ===
Chris Hemsworth was cast to play the lead, Owen Chase, in June 2012. Tom Holland won the role of young Nickerson in April 2013. Cillian Murphy signed on as Matthew Joy in June. Before Benjamin Walker was set to play the Captain, other actors that were considered included Benedict Cumberbatch, Tom Hiddleston, and Henry Cavill.

Based on the look of Brendan Gleeson's elder Thomas Nickerson, it appears as though the filmmakers mistakenly based his appearance on a photograph of a different Thomas Nickerson (1810 – 1892) also born in Massachusetts in the correct time period - but a railroad executive, and completely different person.

Nearly 200 wooden barrels were fashioned for the film by master cooper Alastair Simms, who also appeared in the film making the casks on the ship, as was common in the day.

=== Filming ===
Principal photography began in September 2013 in London and at Warner Bros. Studios, Leavesden in Hertfordshire, England. It was also shot on location on the island of La Gomera (plus some scenes on Lanzarote) in the Canary Islands, Spain. For the storm scenes, the production team built a water tank at Leavesden Studios, where a deck was built on top of a gimbal to mimic the pitch of a storm. To get the right effect, 500 gallons of icy water were poured from cannons.

During one point of filming, the cast and crew were forced to retreat to their hotel by a storm off the Canary Islands, which turned into a rare flash flood. The production shut down for a day and a half, expanding the shoot to 73 days, exactly as filmmakers expected.

In an interview on Jimmy Kimmel Live! Hemsworth stated that to prepare for the role of starving sailors, the cast were on a diet of 500–600 calories a day to lose weight. Hemsworth dropped his weight from 215 to 175 pounds (97.5 to 79.3 kg) to play Owen, saying that In the Heart of the Sea is "physically and emotionally the hardest movie that I've been a part of... Losing the weight to this length, I just never want to do it again, but it had such an emotional effect on us... in some small way, we felt like we were doing what these men went through justice."

=== Music ===
Roque Baños composed the film score. He was recommended by Hans Zimmer, who was initially approached.

In the Heart of the Sea (Original Motion Picture Soundtrack)
No.	Title	Length
1.	"Arriving Nickerson's Lair"	2:51
2.	"Chase Walking Nantucket"	2:05
3.	"Farewell"	2:47
4.	"Young Nickerson"	2:16
5.	"Essex Leaving Harbor"	3:06
6.	"The Knockdown"	6:15
7.	"Blows"	7:07
8.	"A Thousand Leagues Out"	3:23
9.	"Lower Away"	3:54
10.	"The Attack"	5:47
11.	"Abandon Ship"	6:09
12.	"Separations"	4:29
13.	"Stand Off"	3:10
14.	"Homecoming"	7:32
15.	"The Story Is Told"	6:41
16.	"The White Whale Chant"	4:38
17.	"Meeting Old Nickerson" (Bonus Track)	2:26
18.	"The Second Attack" (Bonus Track)	4:19
19.	"Lost at Sea" (Bonus Track)	2:50
20.	"Desert Island" (Bonus Track)	3:44
21.	"Finding the Dead" (Bonus Track)	2:04
22.	"End Credits" ((Alternate Version) [Bonus Track])	1:17
Total length:		88:50

== Release ==
The film was originally scheduled to be released in the United States and Canada on March 13, 2015, but was later pushed back to December 11 in order to convert the film into 3D as well as to give it higher chances of being an awards season contender. Internationally, Warner Bros. decided to open the film early overseas—a week before its United States December 11 opening—to avoid competition with Star Wars: The Force Awakens, which began its theatrical overseas from December 16. The film was released in the Dolby Vision format in Dolby Cinema in North America.

=== Home media ===
In the Heart of the Sea was released on DVD, Blu-ray & Blu-ray 3D on March 8, 2016, before being released on 4K Ultra HD Blu-ray on May 17.

== Reception ==
=== Box office ===
In the Heart of the Sea was one of two flops released by Warner Bros. in 2015, the other being Pan. It grossed $25 million in North America and $68.9 million in other territories for a worldwide total of $93.9 million, against a production budget of $100 million.

In the United States and Canada, the film opened on December 11, 2015, in 3,103 theaters, including a number of RealD 3D, IMAX 3D, and 4DX theaters. Box Office Mojo projected an opening weekend gross of $18 million, noting that the film's only competition was with the holdover of The Hunger Games: Mockingjay – Part 2 (in its fourth weekend of play). The film earned $3.8 million on its opening day, including $575,000 from its early Thursday night showings. In its opening weekend, it earned $11.1 million, finishing below expectations and narrowly losing to Mockingjay – Part 2, which earned $11.4 million. Many box office analysts said the low opening was because audiences' enthusiasm was focused on the arrival of Star Wars: The Force Awakens the following week. Regarding the film's disappointing opening, Jeff Goldstein, Warner Bros. distribution executive vice president said "We stand behind Ron and his vision for the story, we believe in him. He's a terrific filmmaker. But some movies work and unfortunately some movies don't." In its third weekend the film was pulled from 72.3% of theaters (3,103 to 685) the 4th biggest drop in history at the time.

In the Heart of the Sea was released internationally a week prior to its United States opening in 38 markets and grossed a total of $18.5 million with 3.3 million admissions on over 9,500 screens. 50% of the plays were in 3D with 156 IMAX theaters which accounted for 7% of the total opening. It went No. 1 in Russia and the CIS ($2 million) Italy ($1.7 million) and several other Asian markets such as Thailand and Taiwan and No. 2 in South Korea with $2.6 million, behind local hit Inside Men, Mexico with $1.9 million, behind The Good Dinosaur and Brazil with $1.3 million, behind The Hunger Games: Mockingjay – Part 2.

=== Critical response ===
On Rotten Tomatoes, the film has an approval rating of 42% based on 235 reviews and an average rating of 5.5/10. The site's critical consensus reads "The admirably old-fashioned In the Heart of the Sea boasts thoughtful storytelling to match its visual panache, even if it can't claim the depth or epic sweep to which it so clearly aspires." On Metacritic, the film has a score of 47 out of 100 based on 47 critics, indicating "mixed or average" reviews. Audiences polled by CinemaScore gave the film an average grade of "B+" on an A+ to F scale.

Ignatiy Vishnevetsky of The A.V. Club calls the film "ravishing and very corny".

=== Accolades ===
Year	Award/Festival	Category	Recipient(s)	Result
2015	24th Heartland Film Festival	Truly Moving Picture Award	Ron Howard, Imagine Entertainment, and Warner Bros. Pictures	Won
2016	15th Visual Effects Society Awards	Outstanding Supporting Visual Effects in a Photoreal Feature	Jody Johnson, Leslie Lerman, Sean Stranks, Bryan Hirota, and Mark Holt	Nominated
2016	37th Young Artist Awards	Best Performance in a Feature Film - Supporting Young Actor (14 - 21)	Tom Holland	Nominated
2016	18th Teen Choice Awards	Choice Movie: Action	In the Heart of the Sea	Nominated
2016	18th Teen Choice Awards	Choice Movie Actor: Action	Chris Hemsworth	Nominated
2016	18th Teen Choice Awards	Choice Movie Actress: Action	Charlotte Riley	Nominated

== See also ==
- Adaptations of Moby-Dick
- The Whale, a 2013 BBC One television film which depicted the same events
