= James Machon =

US Civil War Navy cabin boy and Medal of Honor recipient

- Born: c. 1848; England
- Military career
- Allegiance: United States; Union
- Branch: United States Navy; Union Navy
- Rank: Cabin boy
- Unit: (United States Navy) USS Brooklyn
- Conflicts: American Civil War
- Awards: Medal of Honor

James Machon (born c. 1848) was a cabin boy in the United States Navy and a Medal of Honor recipient for his role in the Union Navy during the American Civil War.

== Medal of Honor citation ==
Rank and organization: Boy, U.S. Navy.
Born: 1848, England. Accredited to: New York.
G.O. No.: 45, December 31, 1864.

Citation:

On board the U.S.S. Brooklyn during successful attacks against Fort Morgan, rebel gunboats and the ram Tennessee in Mobile Bay, on 5 August 1864. Stationed in the immediate vicinity of the shell whips which were twice cleared of men by bursting shells, Machon remained steadfast at his post and performed his duties in the powder division throughout the furious action which resulted in the surrender of the prize rebel ram Tennessee and in the damaging and destruction of batteries at Fort Morgan.

== See also ==
- List of Medal of Honor recipients
- List of American Civil War Medal of Honor recipients: M–P
