= In the Hurricane's Eye =

- First edition
- Author: Nathaniel Philbrick
- Language: English
- Genre: History
- Publisher: Viking Press
- Publication date: October 16, 2018
- Publication place: United States
- Media type: Print, e-book
- Pages: 384 pp.
- ISBN: 978-0-525-42676-9

In the Hurricane's Eye: The Genius of George Washington and the Victory at Yorktown is a book by American writer Nathaniel Philbrick about the events leading to the Franco-American victory at the 1781 siege of Yorktown. The book was published by Viking Press on October 16, 2018.

== Reception ==
In a 2018 book review in Kirkus Reviews the review summarized the book as "A tense, richly detailed narrative of the American Revolution." Carol Berkin, writing for The Washington Post called Philbrick "a master of narrative" and "To his credit, Philbrick resists the temptation to descend into hagiography."
