= Nantucket shipbuilding =

Nantucket shipbuilding began in the late 1700s and culminated in the construction of notable whaling ships during the early 19th century. Shipbuilding was predominantly sited at Brant Point. Whaling ship construction concluded in 1838.

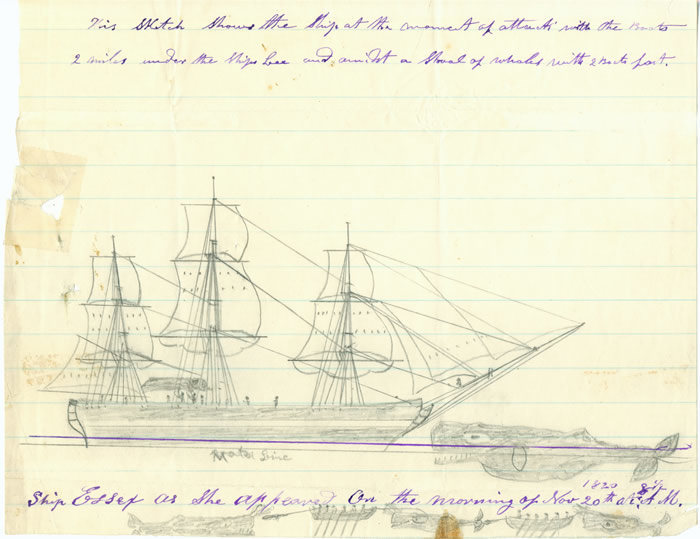
Whaleship Essex, original sketch by Thomas Nickerson. Rammed and sunk by a whale, in the South Pacific, 1820. Image from the collection of the Nantucket Historical Association.

== Shipbuilding at Brant Point ==
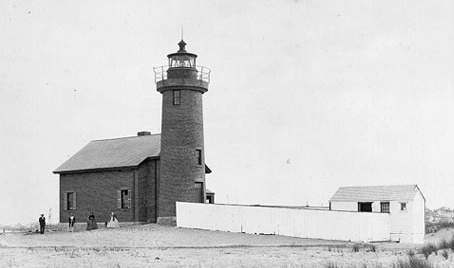
Brant Point Lighthouse, Nantucket, 1856

Nantucket lies 30 miles off the southern coastline of Cape Cod, Massachusetts. By the late 17th century, the few groves of forest trees on Nantucket were gone except for small numbers of isolated oak and beech trees. These relatively few Nantucket forest trees were cut for firewood, fence posts, and short boards for diverse construction projects. Land was taken for agriculture and stock raising. Any timbers needed for architectural and shipbuilding use were imported from the mainland, with the result that most Nantucket whaling, fishing, and maritime trade was carried on in vessels purchased from shipbuilders elsewhere in New England.

Brant Point on the north side of Nantucket harbor still has the sandy beach that was a good site for building large wooden ships and it is the location of Brant Point Light.

The first ship built on Nantucket after the town moved to Great Harbor was the brig Dolphin, a West Indies trader launched in 1770.

In 1802, the trading ship 'Rose' was built at Nantucket for use in the China trade. On her last voyage under the United States flag, the 'Rose' was captured by the British and finished her days as a dispatch ship for the Royal Navy.

== Whaling ships ==
=== The Charles Carroll ===
In 1832, the whaler 'Charles Carroll' was built for captain and 1/32 share owner Owen Chase the first mate and survivor of the Essex tragedy. This history is confirmed by other references to Capt. Owen Chase. .

==== Whaling Voyages of the Charles Carroll ====
- "The 'Charles Carroll', Owen Chase, October 10, 1832, and arrived March 3, 1836, 2610 barrels sperm."
- "The 'Charles Carroll', Owen Chase, August 1836 and arrived February 15, 1840, "nearly full."
- "The 'Charles Carroll', Thomas S. Andrews, May 29, and arrived December 6, 1843, 1926 barrels sperm, sent home 250 barrels sperm.".
- In 1844 – "A 'Charles Carroll' whaler was listed for Nantucket, weight 371 tons, Thomas L. Andrews, captain, W.C. Swain owner."
- "The 'Charles Carroll', Thomas S. Andrews, Pacific Ocean, May 16, and arrived May 29, 1848, 1261 barrels sperm, 473 whale."
- "The 'Charles Carroll', Josiah C. Long, December 2d, and arrived December 29, 1852, 1050 barrels sperm, 93 whale. [Sold 35 barrels sperm and 200 whale on the voyage.] And the 'Charles Carroll' is sold to New Bedford."

=== The Nantucket ===
At 350 tons, Nantucket was the first Nantucket Island ship built of Live oak with copper fastenings. The construction cost for the vessel was $52,000. Nantucket's short life ended when she was wrecked in 1859.

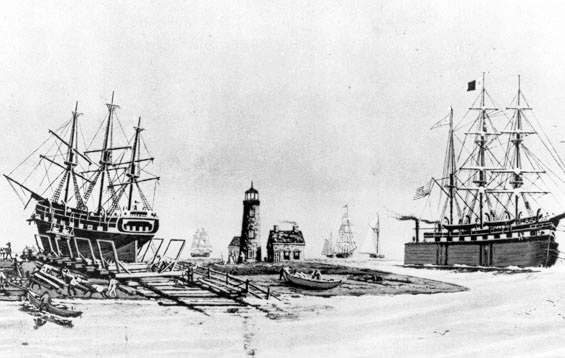
Two whale ships under construction at Brant Point, Nantucket – on the launch ways and on “camels”, nd.

==== Whaling voyages of the Nantucket ====
- "The 'Nantucket', (new) David N. Edwards, Pacific Ocean, sailed December 19, 1837, and arrived November 19, 1839, 1480 barrels sperm, 30 whale."
- "The 'Nantucket', George W. Gardner, June 16, and arrived May 12, 1845, 1279 barrels sperm, 1326 whale."
- "The 'Nantucket', Benjamin C. Gardner, August 17, and arrived January 7, 1850, 2051 barrels sperm."
- "The 'Nantucket', Richard C. Gibbs, June 8, and arrived August 31, 1854, 1022 sperm, 63 whale. [Sent home 769 barrels sperm, 100 whale.] Oil sold $1.50/gallon."
- "The 'Nantucket', Richard C. Gibbs, June 14, 1855, 1022 sperm, 63 whale. [Lost on Nashawena on her homeward passage with 756 bbls sperm, 794 whale on board.] Sold for $950."

=== The Lexington ===
Also built in 1838 of live oak and copper fastenings was the whaler 'Lexington' at 399 tons. She was valued at $24,000 and ended her life when wrecked in 1859. Mrs. Eliza Spenser Brock wrote a detailed and important history of a whaling voyage when she accompanied he husband, and Lexington's captain, on a Lexington whaling voyage in 1853.

==== Whaling Voyages of the Lexington ====
- The 'Lexington' to Edgartown for fitting out. "August, ship Lexington, of this port, in tow of steamer "Telegraph," for Edgartown, to fit for the Pacific Ocean, upset when rounding Brant Point. She was towed in here and righted that night and left for Edgartown on the 29th, her topmasts all housed."
- The 'Lexington', Alexander Pollard, November 27, and arrived June 10, 1840, 2185 barrels sperm. [Capt. Pollard died, and Henry W. Davis finished the voyage."
- The 'Lexington', Henry W. Davis, August 29, and arrived March 14, 1844, 1336 barrels sperm, 1334 whale. [Sent home 125 barrels sperm. Capt. Davis left at Rio sick, Mr. Weeks took charge."
- The 'Lexington', Edward Weeks, June 26, and arrived July 7, 1848, 1780 barrels sperm, 1404 whale."
- The 'Lexington', David Bunker, 2d, November 10, and arrived January 22d, 1853, 742 barrels sperm, 229 whale."
- "The 'Lexington, Peter C. Brock, Atlantic and Pacific Oceans, May 21, and arrived June 25, 1856, 310 barrels sperm, 1637 whale. Sold 20 barrels on the voyage. ..."
- "The 'Lexington', James Fisher, September 19. [Lost on Strong's Island in 1859. Saved 100 barrels whale. ..."

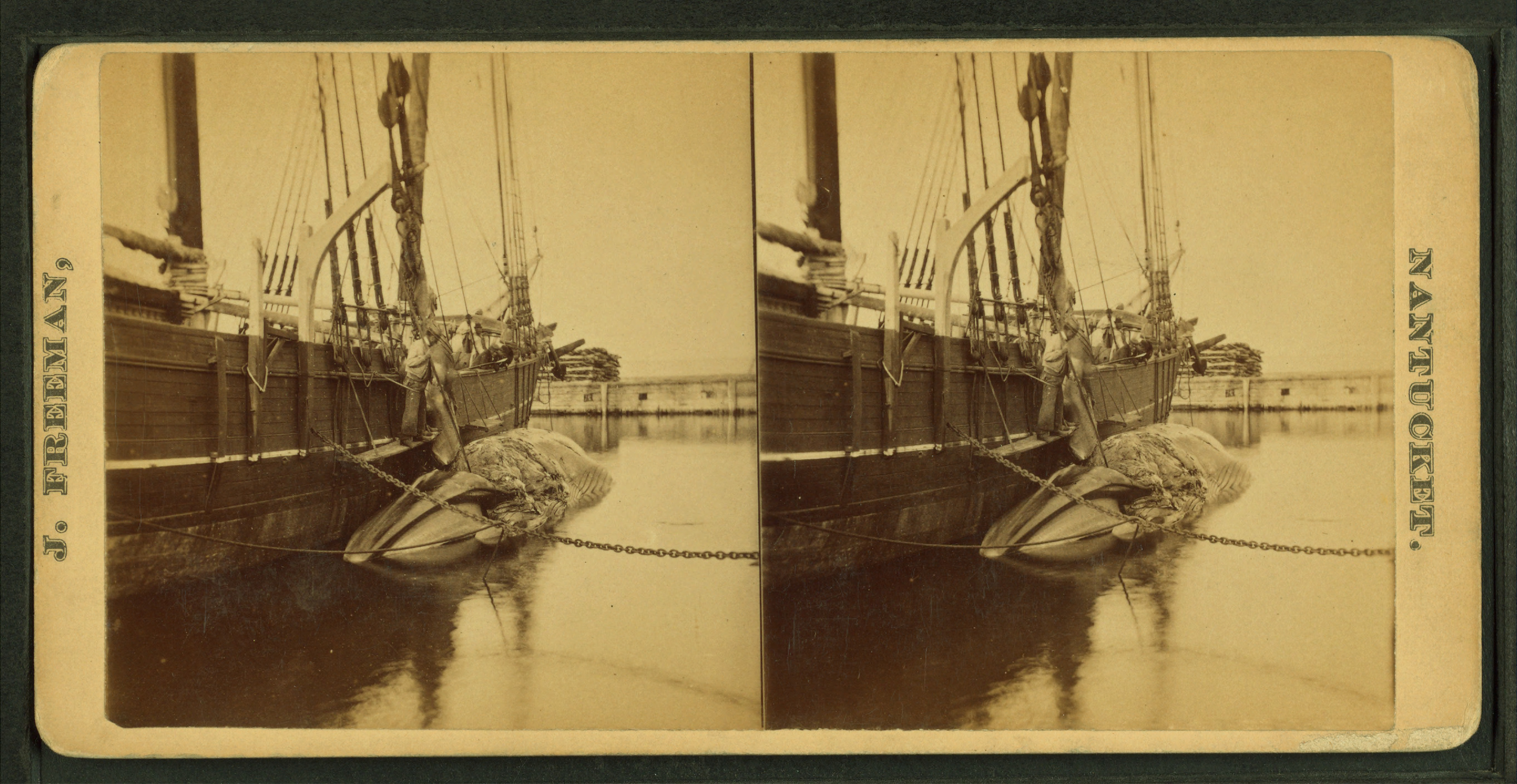
Taking the blubber off, Nantucket Harbor by Josiah Freeman, ?1867–?1890.

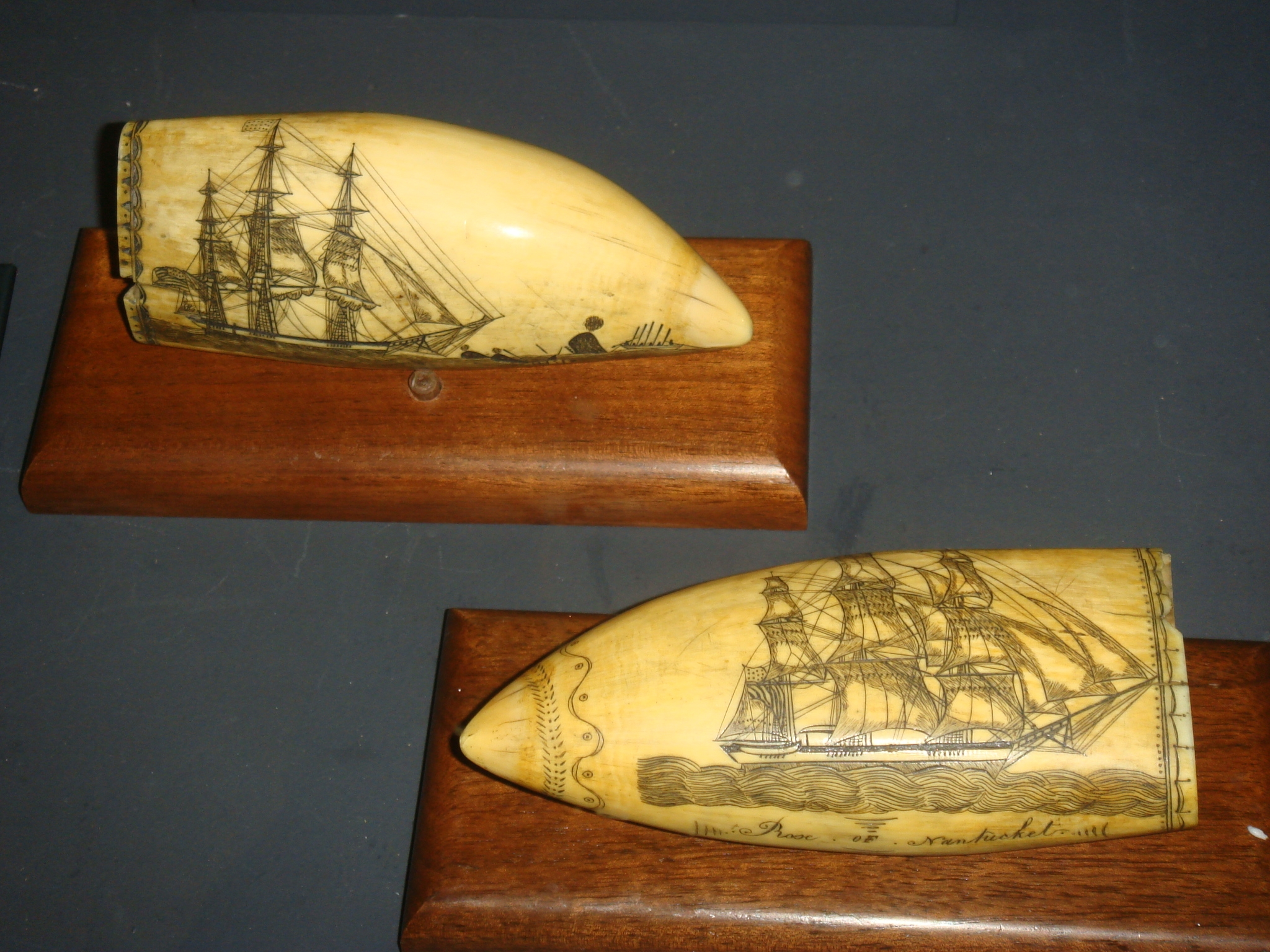
Nantucket Whaler "Rose", scrimshaw by E.Burdett (1805–32)

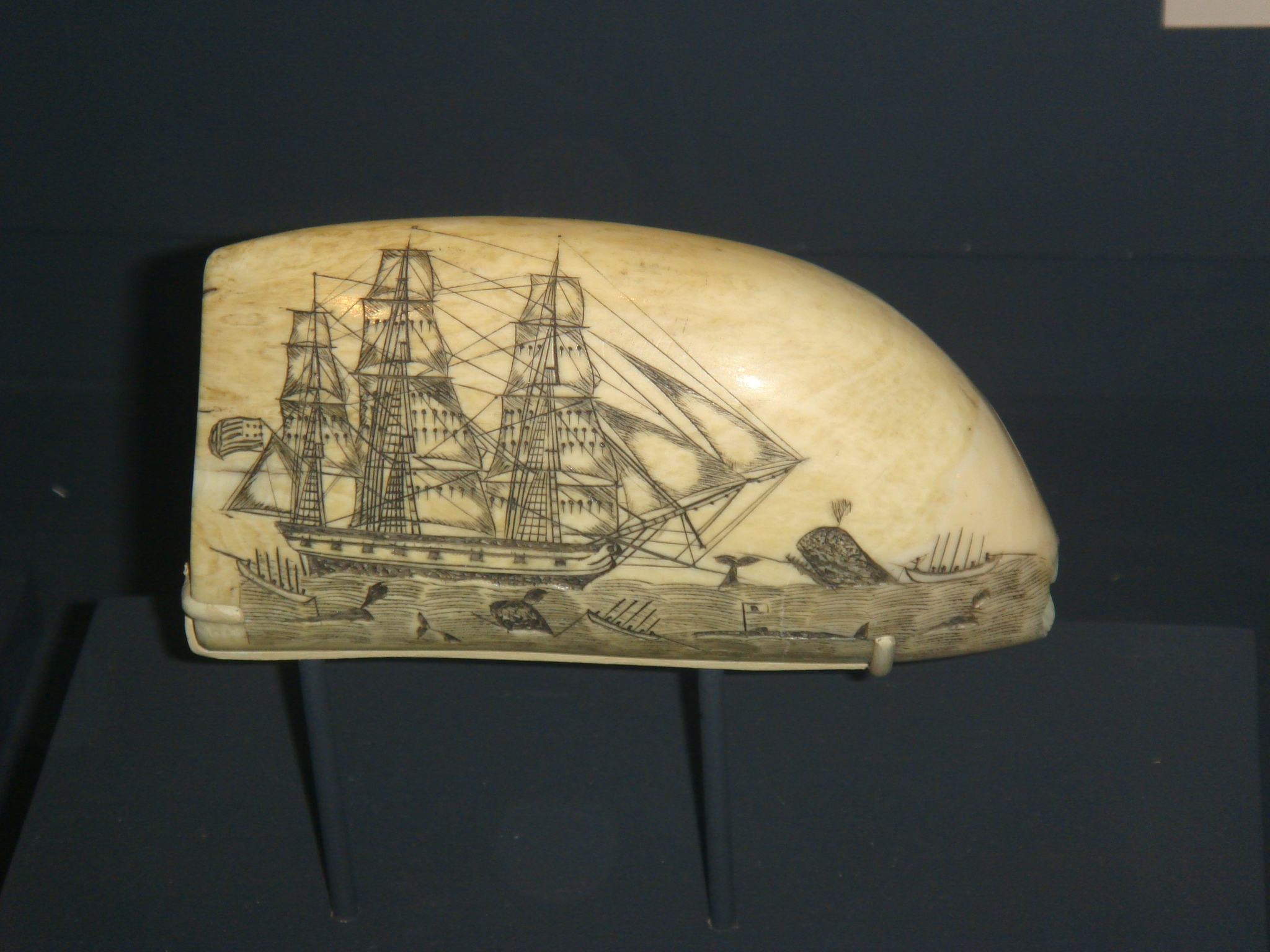
Ocean Whaling Scene, E.Burdett (Nantucket), (1805–32)

=== The Joseph Starbuck ===
In 1838, Joseph Starbuck built the last whaler constructed at Brant Point and named it after himself – the 'Joseph Starbuck'.

Whaling Voyage of the Joseph Starbuck –

- "The 'Joseph Starbuck', (new) Sanford Wilber, November 15, and arrived April 3d, 1842, 3221 barrels sperm."

== Bibliography ==
- Natural Habitats of Nantucket Nantucket Conservation Foundation, 1999–2006.
- Was Nantucket Ever Forested? Originally published in Historic Nantucket, Vol 14, no. 4 (April 1967), p. 15–22 (Nantucket Historical Association).
- Wampanoag history First Nations Site Index and Search Tool, 1996.
- Wampanoag, culture and land use Wampanoag history] Indian Education Program, Anchorage School District, October 1993.
- Whaling, A Timeline in "American Maritime History in the Age of Sail 1492–1865", Barnard History Department, Barnard College, 2008.
- Olde Massachusetts: Sketches of Old Times and Places During the Early Days of the Commonwealth by Charles Burr Todd. The Grafton Press, 1907. Digitized Google Books, January 28, 2008.
- Pre-Revolutionary Diaries at the Massachusetts Historical Society 1635–1790, publ. Massachusetts Historical Society 1988, revised 1992.
- Memorials of Old Bridgehampton, by James Truslow Adams, published by Priv. at The Bridgehmapton News, 1916. Digitized Google Books, January 28, 2008.
- Good Old Dorchester: A Narrative History of the Town, 1630–1893. by William Dana Orcutt, published by the author, printed by J. Wilson, University press, 1893. Google Books, February 11, 2008.
- Maritime Commerce In Maritime History of Massachusetts, National Park Service's National Register of Historic Places and Maritime Heritage Program, in partnership with the Massachusetts Historical Commission and the National Conference of State Historic Preservation Officers, n.d..
- Nantucket A History 1914 by R.A. Douglas-Lithgow, New York: G.P. Putnam's Sons. Google Books, complete text
- "An Island in Time, An Overview of the NHA's Collections with Accompanying Timeline", Historic Nantucket, Vol 49, no. 1 (Winter 2000), p. 12–38, Nantucket Historical Society, 2000.
- MHC Reconnaissance Survey Town Report: Nantucket, Massachusetts Historical Commission, n.d.
- Historical Information About Persons Interred At Prospect Hill Cemetery – Nantucket. Prospect Hill Cemetery Association, Nantucket, Massachusetts, n.d.
- Nantucket Historical District In Maritime History of Massachusetts, National Park Service's National Register of Historic Places and Maritime Heritage Program, in partnership with the Massachusetts Historical Commission and the National Conference of State Historic Preservation Officers, n.d..
- The Story of the New England Whalers by John Randolph Spears, New York: The Macmillan Company, 1908, Google Books July 5, 2007, complete text.
- History of the American Whale Fishery from Its Inception to 1876 by Joseph Starbuck, New York, Castle Books, 1989. Notes: "First published in part IV of the report of the U.S. Commission on Fish and Fisheries, Washington, 1878, also issued privately by the author, 1878." Complete text.
- History of Nantucket Whaling Video presentation by the Director of the Nantucket Historical Association, May, 2008.
- The 'Charles W. Morgan', New Bedford, Massachusetts 1841. Video tour of the last wooden hulled whaling ship afloat in the United States, February, 2008.
- Finding the Mighty Whale, Eighteenth Century Nantucket Whaling and the Development of Environmental Knowledge, by Nathan Tristan Adams, MA thesis (University of British Columbia), August 2010.
- The Whale and His Captors; or the Whalemen's Adventures, and the Whale's Biography, as Gathered on the Homeward Cruise of the "Commodore Preble', by Rev. Henry T. Cheever. New ed. with notes and appendix. New York, Harper & Bros., 1853.
- Catalogue of Nantucket Whalers: And Their Voyages from 1815 to 1870, by Hussey & Robinson, Published by Hussey & Robinson 1876. Google Books, June 27, 2008.
- The Journal of Eliza Brock- At Sea on the 'Lexington' by Sherri Federbush, Nantucket Historical Society, 1982, in the Historic Nantucket, Volume 30, Number 1, July 1982.
- "SPLASH: Boatbuilding on Nantucket", by Joshua B. Gray, Nantucket Today, July 2008.
- Dictionary of American Fighting Ships, Dept. of the Navy, Naval Historical Center, 1959–1981.
