= Mayflower: A Story of Courage, Community, and War =

2006 book by Nathaniel Philbrick

- Author: Nathaniel Philbrick
- Language: English
- Genre: History
- Publisher: Viking Press
- Publication date: 2006
- Publication place: United States
- Media type: Print (hardcover and paperback)

Mayflower: A Story of Courage, Community, and War is a 2006 American history book by American author Nathaniel Philbrick, published by Viking Press. The book tells the events of the Mayflower colonists' landing in North America, and their relations over the following decades with the indigenous Wampanoag people, culminating in the bloody King Philip's War of 1675–78.

== Synopsis ==
Mayflower is divided into four sections. Part I of Mayflower, "Discovery," describes the history of the Pilgrim Fathers before their Atlantic crossing, their difficult voyage, and even more challenging first winter in North America, for which the settlers were poorly prepared. The Pilgrims seek aid from the indigenous Wampanoag people, who like many indigenous groups along North America's east coast had recently been devastated by their first exposure to European disease. The section culminates with the First Thanksgiving in 1622, in which Pilgrims and some Wampanoag joined together to celebrate the Pilgrims' first successful harvest.

Part II, "Accommodation," tells of the Puritans' and Wampanoags' attempts to live together in peace, and Part III, "Community," describes the temporary success of these efforts despite the attempts of Narragansett satchem Miantonomi to unite the indigenous groups to expel the new settlers.

Part IV, "War," describes the collapse of relations between the settlers and indigenous peoples that culminated in the bloodshed of King Philip's War (1675–78). This conflict decimated the Puritan settlements, and many towns were burnt down and destroyed, but the cost for the indigenous peoples was the death of 60-80% of their population through battle, disease, and famine. With the "buffer" of friendly indigenous peoples removed, all of New England was destabilized by a century of Indian Wars. A final chapter of the section, "Conscience," attempts to examine the conflict from an ethical perspective and grapple with its legacy for United States history.

== Critical response ==
The New York Times named Mayflower one of the ten best books of 2006, and it also appeared on the best books lists of The Washington Post, Newsweek, Publishers Weekly, The Boston Globe, and The Chicago Tribune, among others. In 2007, it was a finalist for the Pulitzer Prize for History.
