= Leon Lewis (writer) =

American fiction writer

Julius Warren Lewis (April 8, 1833 – October 28, 1920) was an American writer of popular fiction. He used the name Leon Lewis and wrote under that name among others. A prolific Dime novel author in the 1860s and 1870s, his works include "The Silver Ship", "The Web Of Fate", "The Reef Spider" and many others, serialized in publications as The New York Weekly Journal and the New York Ledger.

Lewis was born in Southington, Connecticut, the son of James D. Lewis and Patty Bishop. At the age of 21, he was living in Massachusetts and considered himself an author. He began his writing career in Boston, which led him to become editor of the flash paper Life in Boston. In 1852, Lewis edited Northern Light, a literary journal published by A. C. Currier.

Lewis received $300 from Enoch Train to start a Know Nothing paper in New York City. The paper failed and Lewis returned to Boston, where he asked for Train's assistance in starting an anti-Know Nothing paper. Train refused to give Lewis any more money and Lewis began sending threatening letters to Train. On January 23, 1885, Lewis went to Train's Dorchester home, informed him that he was armed with a Bowie knife and a revolver, and demanded money from him. Train grabbed Lewis and after a violent struggle, threw him down his front steps and tied him with bed-chord.

In 1860 Lewis married Harriet Newell O'Brien (1841–1878) of Penn Yan, New York. The couple began writing serials for the New York Weekly and the New York Ledger. Harriet Lewis died on May 20, 1878.

Lewis was a summer guest sometime in the 1870s at a boarding house owned by Thomas Nickerson. He was a retired sailor who had survived the sinking of the whaleship Essex as a cabin boy. (The first mate's 1821 account of the disaster, as well as personal contact with the captain, inspired Herman Melville in writing his 1851 novel Moby Dick.) Lewis encouraged Nickerson to write down his story and in 1876 received from Nickerson a manuscript with additional accounts of his life. Lewis did nothing with the material, but a friend of his secured the trunk that contained it during Lewis' crisis with creditors in 1879. It was discovered by the friend's family in 1960.

In January 1879, Lewis disappeared from Penn Yan owing more than $50,000. He sailed with his deceased wife's 15-year-old niece, Julia E. Wheelock (b. 1865), daughter of disabled Civil War veteran Cyrus Wheelock (1837 – 5 Feb 1918) and Helen Elizabeth O'Brien (1843 – 1906), and married her in Brazil. During the 1880s he wrote boys' stories in England. Their daughter Harriet Wheelock Lewis was born in London, England, became a teacher in Connecticut and later married Carl Asahel French. Their son Leon Lewis (15 March 1885 in Greenport, Long Island, New York – 26 February 1976 in Farmington Hills, Michigan) lived in New Hartford most of his life, spending his final years with his daughter Leona L. Lewis and her husband Nicholas Pedersen in Michigan.

By 1910, Lewis was living with his sister Sara in New Hartford, Connecticut. Lewis and Julia were divorced in 1913. Living with his sister in Bakersville, Connecticut, he died October 28, 1920, in a Winsted, Connecticut, hospital.
