= Green hand (whaling) =

Term for an inexperienced crew member

A green hand (also "greenhand" or "greenie") is a term for an inexperienced crew member of a 19th-century whaler on his first voyage, and who would typically have the smallest "lay", or share, in the profits.

== See also ==
- Whaling
- History of whaling
