= Revenge of the Whale =

2002 book

Revenge of the Whale: The True Story of the Whaleship Essex
- Author: Nathaniel Philbrick
- Genre: History
- Publication date: 2002

Revenge of the Whale: The True Story of the Whaleship Essex was written by Nathaniel Philbrick. The 2002 historical book recounts the 1820 sinking of the whaleship Essex by an enraged sperm whale and how the crew of young men survived against impossible odds. Revenge of the Whale is based on the author's adult book In the Heart of the Sea.

By the same title, the dramatized documentary movie production of Revenge of the Whale was released as a TV Movie on September 7, 2001.
