= In the Heart of the Sea =

2000 book by Nathaniel Philbrick

- Hardcover edition
- Author: Nathaniel Philbrick
- Language: English
- Subject: New England, whaling
- Genre: History
- Publisher: Viking Press
- Publication date: May 8, 2000
- Publication place: United States
- Media type: Print, e-book
- Pages: 320 pp.
- ISBN: 0-670-89157-6
- OCLC: 608132810

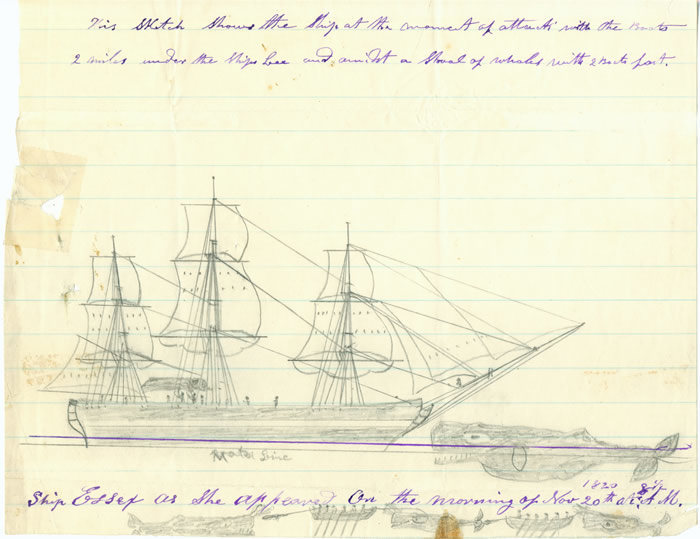
The Essex struck by a whale, a sketch by Thomas Nickerson

In the Heart of the Sea: The Tragedy of the Whaleship Essex is a book by American writer Nathaniel Philbrick about the loss of the whaler Essex in the Pacific Ocean in 1820. The book was published by Viking Press on May 8, 2000, and won the 2000 National Book Award for Nonfiction. It was adapted into a film of the same name, which was released in December 2015.

== Summary ==
The Essex, an American whaleship from Nantucket, Massachusetts, sank after a sperm whale attacked it in the Pacific Ocean in November 1820. Having lost their ship, the crew of the Essex attempted to sail to South America in whaleboats. After suffering from starvation and dehydration, most of the crew died before the survivors were rescued in February 1821.

In retelling the story of the crew's ordeal, Philbrick uses an account written by Thomas Nickerson, who was a teenage cabin boy on board the Essex and wrote about the experience in his old age; Nickerson's account was found in 1960 but was not authenticated until 1980. In 1984, an abridged version of his account was finally published. The book also uses the better known account of Owen Chase, the ship's first mate, which was published soon after the ordeal.

== Reception ==
In the Heart of the Sea won the 2000 U.S. National Book Award for Nonfiction.

== Film adaptation ==
The story was adapted into a feature film by director Ron Howard, starring Chris Hemsworth, Ben Whishaw, and Cillian Murphy. Advertising for the film points out that the historical story inspired the Moby Dick mythology.

== See also ==
- Ann Alexander, a ship sunk by a whale on August 20, 1851
- Cannibalism at sea
