= Cabin boy =

Low-ranking young male assistant on a ship

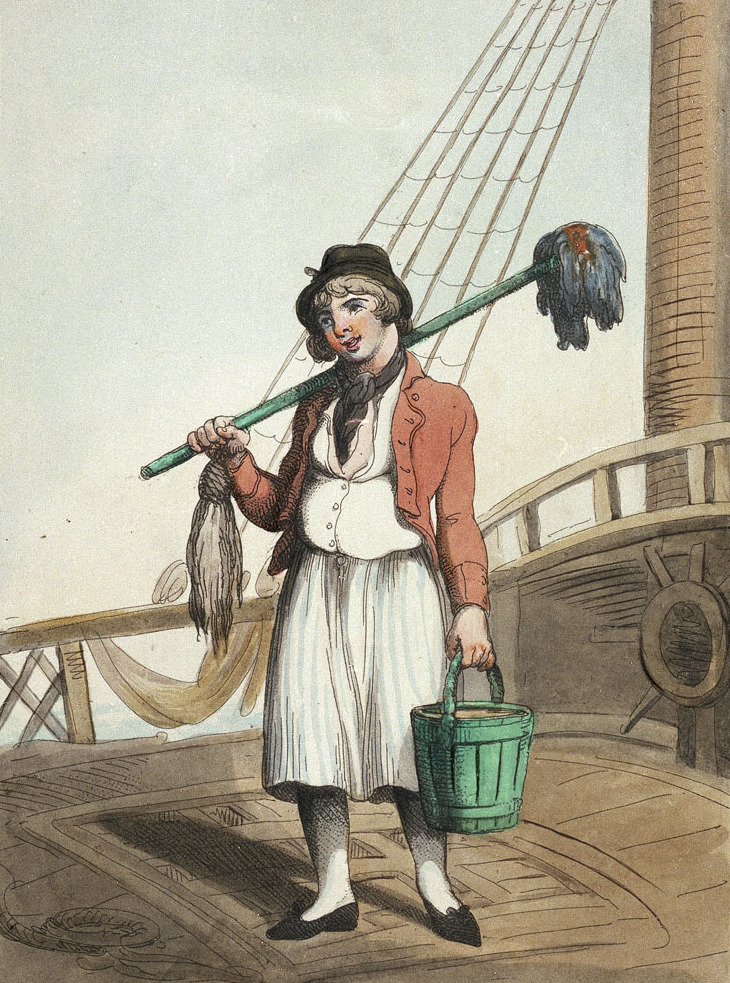
1799 illustration of a Royal Navy cabin boy

A cabin boy or ship's boy is a boy or young man who waits on the officers and passengers of a ship, especially running errands for the captain. The modern merchant navy successor to the cabin boy is the steward's assistant.

== Duties ==
Cabin boys were usually 13–16 years old, but sometimes as young as 8, and also helped the cook in the ship's kitchen and carried buckets of food from the ship's kitchen to the forecastle where the ordinary seamen ate. They would have to scramble up the rigging into the yards whenever the sails had to be trimmed. They would occasionally stand watch like other crewmen or act as helmsman in good weather, holding the wheel to keep the ship steady on her course. They could be found on pirate ships sometimes.

== Royal Navy officers ==
Several prominent British Royal Navy officers began their career as cabin boys. The list includes officers that achieved an admiralty rank before 1801.

- Admiral of the Fleet Sir William Parker, 1st Baronet, of Shenstone
- Admiral of the Fleet Sir Cloudsley Shovell
- Admiral Sir Francis Drake
- Admiral Sir John Hawkins
- Admiral (General) Richard Deane
- Admiral (Colonel) William Rainsborough
- Admiral Sir William Penn
- Vice Admiral Lord Nelson
- Vice Admiral Sir William Batten
- Vice Admiral Sir John Lawson
- Vice Admiral (Captain) Badilow
- Vice Admiral Sir Thomas Tiddeman
- Vice Admiral (Captain) James Peacock
- Vice Admiral (Captain) William Goodsonn
- Vice Admiral Sir Christopher Myngs
- Vice Admiral Sir John Harman
- Rear Admiral Sir John Berry
- Rear Admiral Sir Richard Stainer
- Rear Admiral (Captain) Anthony Houlding
- Rear Admiral (Captain) Deacons
- Rear Admiral (Captain) Robert Sansum

== Notable cabin boys ==
- Matthew Henson, cabin boy at the age of 12. Went on to accompany Robert Peary in his Arctic explorations. Henson claimed to have been the first person to reach the North Pole.
- John Anglin, cabin boy who received the Medal of Honor during the American Civil War.
- Commodore John Barry. Would go on to serve in the American Revolutionary War and is known as "the Father of the American Navy."
- Hobart Bosworth, cabin boy on the Sovereign of the Seas who became a famous actor.
- Christian Franzen, cabin boy who served in the Wisconsin State Assembly.
- Michael Healy, cabin boy in 1854, who became the first African-American to command a ship of the United States Government.
- James Machon, cabin boy who received the Medal of Honor during the American Civil War.
- Thomas Nickerson, cabin boy on the Essex who later wrote about the shipwreck and subsequent three months of survival at sea.
- Frederick Pabst, cabin boy at the age of 14 and Great Lakes Captain at 21. Later became an American brewing pioneer and led Pabst Brewing Company into prominence in the late 1800s.
- John H. Paynter, cabin boy who enlisted in 1884, later became a real estate developer and writer of poetry and nonfiction, including the acclaimed Fugitive of the Pearl (1930).
- John Ward Westcott, cabin boy at the age of 13 and a Great Lakes captain at 20. He developed a special vessel mail system.
- Harold Lowe, British merchant sailor and naval officer who served as fifth officer of RMS Titanic, began his career at sea as a cabin boy aboard Welsh coastal schooners.
- William Thomas Turner, last captain of RMS Lusitania, began his merchant service as a ship's boy on sailing ships.

== In popular culture ==
- Cori, de Scheepsjongen ("Cori the Cabin Boy"), a comics series by Belgian artist Bob de Moor about a cabin boy working for the Verenigde Oostindische Compagnie in the 16th century.
- Cabin Boy, a 1994 film.
- "Cabin Boy" a song by Tom Robinson from the 1984/1997 Castaway Northwest CNWVP006 album War Baby.
- Captain Pugwash, a British television children's animated series about a hapless captain and his crew; Tom, the cabin boy, is depicted as the most intelligent member of the crew.
- Treasure Island, where the main character Jim serves as a cabin boy on the board the ship the Hispaniola.
- "Cabin Boy", a short story by Damon Knight.
- In The Terror AMC, the first season of the show showcased four fictionalised versions of the real ship boys of the Franklin Expedition. Thomas Evans, Robert Golding, David Young and George Chambers.
