= Essex (whaleship) =

American ship sunk by a whale (1799–1820)

Coordinates: 0°41′S 118°00′W

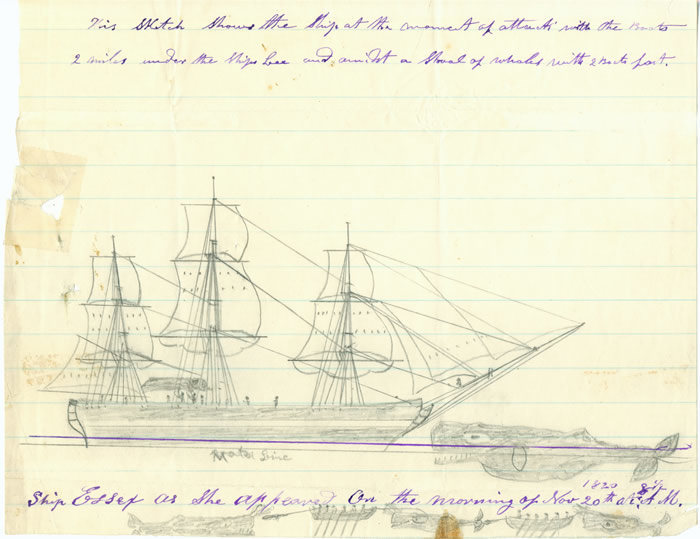
- A whale striking Essex on November 20, 1820, depicted in a sketch by Thomas Nickerson

History

United States
- Name: Essex
- Laid down: Amesbury, Massachusetts, US
- Launched: 1799
- Fate: Attacked and sunk by a sperm whale, November 20, 1820

General characteristics
- Type: Whaler
- Tons burthen: 238 72/95 (bm)
- Length: 87 ft 7 in (26.7 m)
- Beam: 24 ft 0 in (7.3 m)
- Depth: 12 ft 6 in (3.8 m)
- Notes: Four whaleboats, 20–30 feet (6.1–9.1 m), plus one spare

Essex was an American whaling ship from Nantucket, Massachusetts, which was launched in 1799. On November 20, 1820, while at sea in the southern Pacific Ocean under the command of Captain George Pollard Jr., the ship was attacked and sunk by a sperm whale. About 2,000 nautical miles (3,700 km) from the coast of South America, the 20-man crew was forced to make for land in three whaleboats with what food and water they could salvage from the wreck.

After a month at sea, the crew landed on the uninhabited Henderson Island. Three men elected to stay on the island, from which they were rescued in April 1821, while the remaining seventeen set off again for the coast of South America. The men suffered severe dehydration, starvation and exposure on the open ocean, and the survivors eventually resorted to cannibalism. By the time they were rescued in February 1821, three months after the sinking of Essex, only five of the seventeen were alive.

First mate Owen Chase and cabin boy Thomas Nickerson later wrote accounts of the ordeal. The tragedy attracted international attention, and it was one of the inspirations for Herman Melville's 1851 novel, Moby-Dick.

== Ship and crew ==
When Essex departed from Nantucket, Massachusetts, on her fateful voyage in August 1819, she was considered to be a lucky vessel, as her previous six whaling expeditions had brought in good profits. She was twenty years old and had been refitted during the summer. At only 88 feet (27 m) in length, and measuring about 239 tons burthen, Essex was small for a three-masted whaling ship. She was equipped with five whaleboats, each about 28 ft (8.5 m) in length.

Essex set sail with a crew of twenty-one men. Twelve, including the officers and two of the three boatsteerers, were born or raised in Nantucket while nine were off-islanders. The captain, 29-year-old George Pollard Jr., had sailed as second mate of Essex in 1815–1816, and as first mate in 1817–1819. The first mate, 21-year-old Owen Chase, had sailed on Essex in 1817–1819. The second mate was 26-year-old Matthew Joy. The three boatsteerers were Obed Hendricks and Benjamin Lawrence, both 20 years old and from Nantucket, and Englishman Thomas Chappel. At age 14, cabin boy Thomas Nickerson was the youngest member of the crew, while at least five more were under the age of 20.

Role	Name	Age	Race	Home	Fate
Captain	George Pollard	29	White	Nantucket	Survived
First mate	Owen Chase	21	White	Nantucket	Survived
Second mate	Matthew Joy	26	White	Nantucket	Died
Boatsteerer	Obed Hendricks	20	White	Nantucket	Presumed dead
Boatsteerer	Benjamin Lawrence	20	White	Nantucket	Survived
Boatsteerer	Thomas Chappel	Age unknown	White	England	Survived. Rescued on Henderson Island.
Steward	William Bond	Age unknown	Black	Birthplace unknown	Presumed dead
Cabin boy	Thomas Nickerson	14	White	Grew up on Nantucket	Survived
Seaman	Owen Coffin	16	White	Nantucket	Shot and eaten
Seaman	Isaac Cole	Age unknown	White	Rochester, Massachusetts	Died and eaten
Seaman	Henry DeWitt	Age unknown	Black	Birthplace unknown	Jumped ship
Seaman	Richard Peterson	About 60	Black	New York	Died
Seaman	Charles Ramsdell	15	White	Nantucket	Survived
Seaman	Barzillai Ray	17	White	Nantucket	Died and eaten
Seaman	Samuel Reed	Age unknown	Black	Birthplace unknown	Died and eaten
Seaman	Isaiah Sheppard	Age unknown	Black	Birthplace unknown	Died and eaten
Seaman	Charles Shorter	Age unknown	Black	Birthplace unknown	Died and eaten
Seaman	Lawson Thomas	Age unknown	Black	Birthplace unknown	Died and eaten
Seaman	Seth Weeks	16	White	Barnstable, Massachusetts	Survived. Rescued on Henderson Island.
Seaman	Joseph West	Age unknown	White	Birthplace unknown	Presumed dead
Seaman	William Wright	18	White	Barnstable, Massachusetts	Survived. Rescued on Henderson Island.

== Final voyage ==
=== Round Cape Horn ===
Essex departed from Nantucket on August 12, 1819, on what was expected to be a roughly two-and-a-half-year voyage to the whaling grounds off the west coast of South America. The route towards Cape Horn was an indirect one dictated by the prevailing winds of the Atlantic Ocean. First the ship would sail with the westerlies towards Europe and Africa, and then back towards South America with the northeast trade winds. There were scheduled stops at the Azores and Cape Verde Islands, where the ship could be stocked with provisions more cheaply than at Nantucket.

A few days into the voyage, Essex was hit by a sudden squall in the Gulf Stream. She was knocked on her beam-ends and nearly sank; damages included the loss of her topgallant sail and two whaleboats, with an additional whaleboat sustaining minor damage. Pollard's initial thought was to return to Nantucket for repairs, but he accepted the arguments of Chase and Joy, the first and second mates, who wished to continue to the Azores. At the Cape Verde Islands the crew were able to purchase a whaleboat. Later, as Essex sailed down the east coast of South America, three months into the voyage, the first whale was killed.

In the face of strong winds from the west, Essex took over a month to round Cape Horn into the whaling grounds of the South Pacific. In January 1820 she met up with other whalers from Nantucket at St Mary's Island off the west coast of Chile.

=== Whaling grounds depleted ===
After several months searching for whales off the coast of Chile, Essex sailed north and met with more success off the coast of Peru. Within two months they had killed enough whales to produce 450 barrels of oil. In May 1820, Essex hailed Aurora, another whaler from Nantucket, whose captain told them that another whaling ground, known as the "offshore ground", had been discovered more than 1,000 miles (1,600 km) off the Peruvian coast. Pollard decided that, after making provisioning stops, he would set sail for these new grounds, rather than stay in the depleted coastal grounds.

In September 1820, Essex sailed to the Peruvian port town of Atacames (now part of Ecuador). It was here that Henry DeWitt jumped ship, leaving Essex with a crew of only twenty. When whales were spotted from Essex, the three whaleboats, each with an officer, a boatsteerer and four crew members, would go in pursuit. Without DeWitt, there would be only two crew members left aboard Essex, not enough to safely handle a ship of Essex's size and type.

=== Repairs and resupply at the Galápagos Islands ===
To restock their food supplies for the long journey, Essex sailed for Charles Island (later renamed Floreana Island) in the Galápagos Islands. The crew needed to fix a serious leak and initially anchored off Hood Island (now known as Española Island) on October 8, 1820. During a week at anchor, they captured 300 Galápagos giant tortoises to supplement the ship's food stores. They then sailed for Charles Island, where on October 22 they took another sixty tortoises. The tortoises weighed between 100 and 800 pounds (45 and 363 kg) each. The sailors captured them alive and allowed some of them to roam the ship at will; the rest they kept in the hold. They believed the tortoises were capable of living for a year without eating or drinking water (though in fact the tortoises slowly starved).

While hunting on Charles Island, Chappel lit a fire as a prank. It was the height of the dry season, and the fire quickly burned out of control, surrounding the hunters and forcing them to run through the flames to escape. By the time the men returned to Essex, almost the entire island was burning and Pollard swore vengeance on whoever had set it. The next day, the island was still burning as the ship sailed for the offshore grounds; even after a full day of sailing, the fire was still visible on the horizon. Chappel would only admit that he had set the fire much later after Essex sank. Many years later, Nickerson returned to Charles Island and found a blackened wasteland; he observed "neither trees, shrubbery, nor grass have since appeared".

=== Whale attack ===
When Essex reached the hunting grounds about 1,000 miles (1,600 km) west of the Galápagos Islands, whales still proved elusive. When they finally found a whale on November 16, 1820, it surfaced directly beneath Chase's boat. No one was injured, but the boat required repairs.

At eight in the morning of November 20, 1820, the lookout sighted spouts, and the three remaining whaleboats set out to pursue a pod of sperm whales. On the leeward side of Essex, Chase's whaleboat harpooned a whale, but its tail struck the boat and opened up a seam, forcing the crew to cut the harpoon line and return to Essex for repairs. Two miles away off the windward side, Pollard's and Joy's boats each harpooned a whale and were dragged away from Essex.

Chase was repairing the damaged whaleboat on board Essex (which he believed to be faster than lowering the spare whaleboat) when the crew sighted an unusually large sperm whale bull (reportedly around 85 feet (26 m) in length) acting strangely. It lay motionless on the surface facing the ship and then began to swim towards the vessel, picking up speed by shallow diving. The whale rammed Essex, rocking her from side to side, and then dived under her, surfacing close on the ship's starboard side. As its head lay alongside the bow and the tail by the stern, it was motionless and appeared to be stunned. Chase prepared to harpoon it from the deck when he realized that its tail was only inches from the rudder, which the whale could easily destroy if provoked by an attempt to kill it. Fearing to leave the ship stuck thousands of miles from land with no way to steer it, Chase hesitated. The whale recovered, swam several hundred yards forward of the ship, and turned to face the ship's bow.

I turned around and saw him about one hundred rods [500 m or 550 yards] directly ahead of us, coming down with twice his ordinary speed of around 24 knots (44 km/h), and it appeared with tenfold fury and vengeance in his aspect. The surf flew in all directions about him with the continual violent thrashing of his tail. His head about half out of the water, and in that way he came upon us, and again struck the ship.

— Owen Chase

The whale crushed the bow, driving the vessel backwards, and then finally disengaged its head from the shattered timbers and swam off, leaving Essex quickly going down by the bow. Chase and the remaining sailors retrieved the spare whaleboat while the steward, William Bond, ran below to gather the captain's sea chest and whatever navigational aids he could find. The whaleboats of Pollard and Joy were about 2 miles (3.2 km) from Essex when one of the boatsteerers looked back and saw the ship falling on her beam-ends. The two boats hurriedly released their whales and rowed back to Essex.

The captain's boat was the first that reached us. He stopped about a boat's length off, but had no power to utter a single syllable; he was so completely overpowered with the spectacle before him. He was in a short time, however, enabled to address the inquiry to me, "My God, Mr. Chase, what is the matter?" I answered, "We have been stove by a whale."

— Owen Chase

The cause of the whale's aggression is not known. In In the Heart of the Sea, author Nathaniel Philbrick speculated that it may have first struck the boat accidentally or have had its curiosity aroused by the sound of a hammer as the damaged whaleboat was being repaired. The frequency and sound of the nailing may have sounded similar to those made by bull sperm whales to communicate and echolocate.

== Survivors ==
=== Abandoning the wreck ===
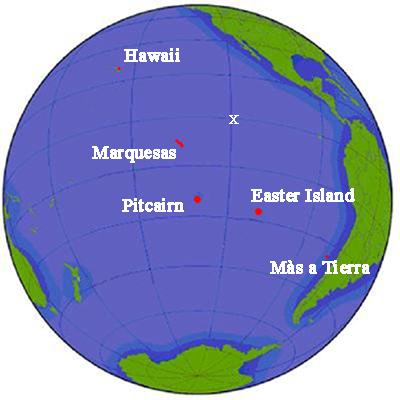
Location of Essex's sinking

The crew spent the next two days salvaging what supplies remained from the waterlogged wreck of Essex. Three whaleboats were rigged with makeshift masts and sails taken from Essex, and boards were added to heighten the gunwales and prevent large waves from spilling over the sides. Inside Pollard's sea chest, which Bond's quick thinking had managed to save, were two sets of navigational equipment and two copies of Nathaniel Bowditch's New American Practical Navigator. These were split between Pollard's and Chase's boats; Joy's boat was left without any means of navigating except to keep within sight of the other boats.

Essex sank approximately 2,000 nautical miles (3,700 km) west of South America. The officers debated which route to take towards land. Pollard favored sailing west with the prevailing winds and current. The nearest islands to the west were Marquesas Islands, about 1,200 miles (1,900 km) away, but Pollard was afraid they would encounter cannibals there and concluded that it would be better to sail to the Society Islands, about 2,000 miles (3,200 km). Chase and Joy disagreed, fearing that the Society islanders might be cannibals, and suggested sailing south for about 1,500 miles (2,400 km) and then picking up a band of variable winds to take them to the coast of Chile or Peru, all the time hoping to come across another whaleship. In fact, both the Marquesas and Society Islands would have been safe destinations, as the inhabitants were at that time friendly towards mariners, but Pollard accepted the suggestion of Chase and Joy.

Herman Melville later speculated that the crew would all have survived had they followed Pollard's recommendation and sailed to the Society Islands, writing: "All the sufferings of these miserable men of the Essex might, in all human probability, have been avoided had they immediately after leaving the wreck, steered straight for Tahiti, from which they were not very distant at the time. But they dreaded cannibals".

The crew were divided between the three boats, under the command of Pollard, Chase and Joy, and on November 22, 1820, set off for land. Never designed for long voyages, all the whaleboats had been very roughly repaired, and leaks were a constant and serious problem during the voyage. After losing a timber, the crew of one boat had to lean to one side to raise the other side out of the water until another boat was able to draw close, allowing a sailor to nail a piece of wood over the hole. Storms and rough seas frequently plagued the tiny whaleboats, and the men who were not occupied with steering and trimming the sails spent most of their time bailing water from the bilge.

Food and water were rationed from the beginning, with the men first consuming the bread that had been soaked in seawater, even though it increased their thirst. After ten days of eating only meagre rations of bread, they slaughtered the first of the giant tortoises that had been salvaged from the wreck and achieved a small respite from hunger.

=== Landfall ===
On December 20, exactly one month after the whale attack, with the men suffering from starvation, dehydration and exposure, the boats landed on uninhabited Henderson Island, a small uplifted coral atoll within the modern-day British territory of the Pitcairn Islands. The men incorrectly believed that they had landed on Ducie Island, a similar atoll 220 miles (350 km) to the east. Had they landed on Pitcairn Island itself, 120 miles (190 km) to the southwest, they might have received help; the descendants of the survivors of HMS Bounty, who had mutinied in 1789, still lived there.

On Henderson Island, Essex's crew found food in the form of birds, eggs, crabs, fish and peppergrass but water proved more difficult to find, although they eventually came across a freshwater spring below the tideline. After just one week, they had largely exhausted the island's food resources. On December 26, they concluded they would starve if they remained much longer. As most of the crew prepared to set sail in the whaleboats once again, three men – William Wright, Seth Weeks and Thomas Chappel, the only white members of the crew who were not natives of Nantucket – opted to stay behind on the island. Pollard promised, if he made it back to South America, to see that they were rescued. Pollard was true to his word, and the three men on Henderson Island were rescued by Surry, an Australian trading vessel, in April 1821.

The evening before departing the island, Pollard wrote two letters–a personal letter to his wife, and a letter detailing the events which had befallen the Essex and her crew. These letters were placed into an improvised mailbox attached to a tree to the west of their encampment. The letters were later collected by the Surry.

=== Separation and cannibalism ===
The remaining Essex crewmen, now numbering seventeen in three boats, resumed their journey on December 27 with the intention of reaching Easter Island. On January 4, 1821, they estimated that they had drifted too far south of Easter Island and decided to make for Más Afuera Island off the coast of Chile. On the same day they exhausted their supply of fish and birds from Henderson Island and were back on daily rations of a cup of water and three ounces of bread.

On January 10, Joy, who had been in poor health even before Essex left Nantucket, died; his body was consigned to the sea. Pollard's boatsteerer, Obed Hendricks, took over the command of Joy's boat. The following day, Chase's boat became separated from the others during a squall. On January 20, Richard Peterson died on Chase's boat and his body too was buried at sea.

On the same day, more than 100 miles (160 km) to the north, Lawson Thomas died on Hendricks's boat. By this time the provisions on Pollard's and Hendricks's boats had almost run out, and they decided to eat the body. Two days later Charles Shorter died and was eaten. Within a few days Isaiah Sheppard and Samuel Reed suffered a similar fate. It has been observed that the first four crew members to die and be eaten were all African American. This may have been due to the inferior diet on which African Americans subsisted aboard whaleships, potentially compounded by differences in natural body fat retention tendencies among different ethnic groups. On the night of January 29, the boats of Pollard and Hendricks became separated. Hendricks's boat lacked any navigational equipment and he and his two remaining crew members, William Bond and Joseph West, were never seen again. Months later a whaleboat with four skeletons in it was found washed up on Ducie Island, and it was suggested that the boat was Hendricks's.

By February 6, the crew of Pollard's boat were again starving. It was decided to draw lots, and Owen Coffin was shot and eaten. Five days later Barzillai Ray died and was eaten by Pollard and Charles Ramsdell. Meanwhile, the men in Chase's boat had resorted to cannibalism when Isaac Cole died on February 10. "I have no language to paint the anguish of our souls in this dreadful dilemma", Chase later recounted in his memoirs.

== Rescue and reunion ==
On the morning of February 18, Lawrence, who was steering Chase's boat, spotted a sail a few miles distant. They managed to catch up with the vessel, which turned out to be the British merchant ship Indian. Too weak to climb aboard the ship, Chase, Lawrence and Nickerson had to be lifted from their boat and carried to the captain's cabin. Later that day they came within sight of Más Afuera, the island towards which Chase had, with remarkable accuracy, been navigating. A few days later, Indian sailed into the port of Valparaíso. The whaleboat, which was being towed behind Indian, was lost in a gale.

On February 23, ninety-three days after the sinking of Essex, Pollard and Ramsdell were spotted by the Nantucket whaleship Dauphin near St Mary's Island off the coast of Chile, where Essex had stopped over a year before. Pollard and Ramsdell were close to starvation, sucking marrow from the bones of their dead shipmates and drifting in and out of consciousness when they were taken aboard Dauphin. They were then transferred to another Nantucket whaleship, Two Brothers, which was sailing for Valparaíso. On March 17, they reached the port and were reunited with Chase, Lawrence and Nickerson, who had been recovering on the frigate USS Constellation, commanded by Charles G. Ridgely and under the care of the ship's surgeon. All the whaleboat survivors were Nantucketers. On March 23, Chase, Lawrence, Nickerson and Ramsdell set off for Nantucket in the whaleship Eagle. Pollard was still too weak to make the journey and followed them aboard Two Brothers in May.

The commander of Constellation arranged the rescue of the three seamen who had stayed on what they thought was Ducie Island (actually Henderson Island). He asked the captain of an Australian trading vessel, Surry, which was returning to Australia, to stop at Ducie Island and pick up the survivors. When they found Ducie Island uninhabited, the captain of Surry wondered if the officers of Essex had confused Ducie and Henderson Islands and decided to sail on to Henderson Island, where they found Chappel, Weeks, and Wright on April 9.

== Aftermath ==
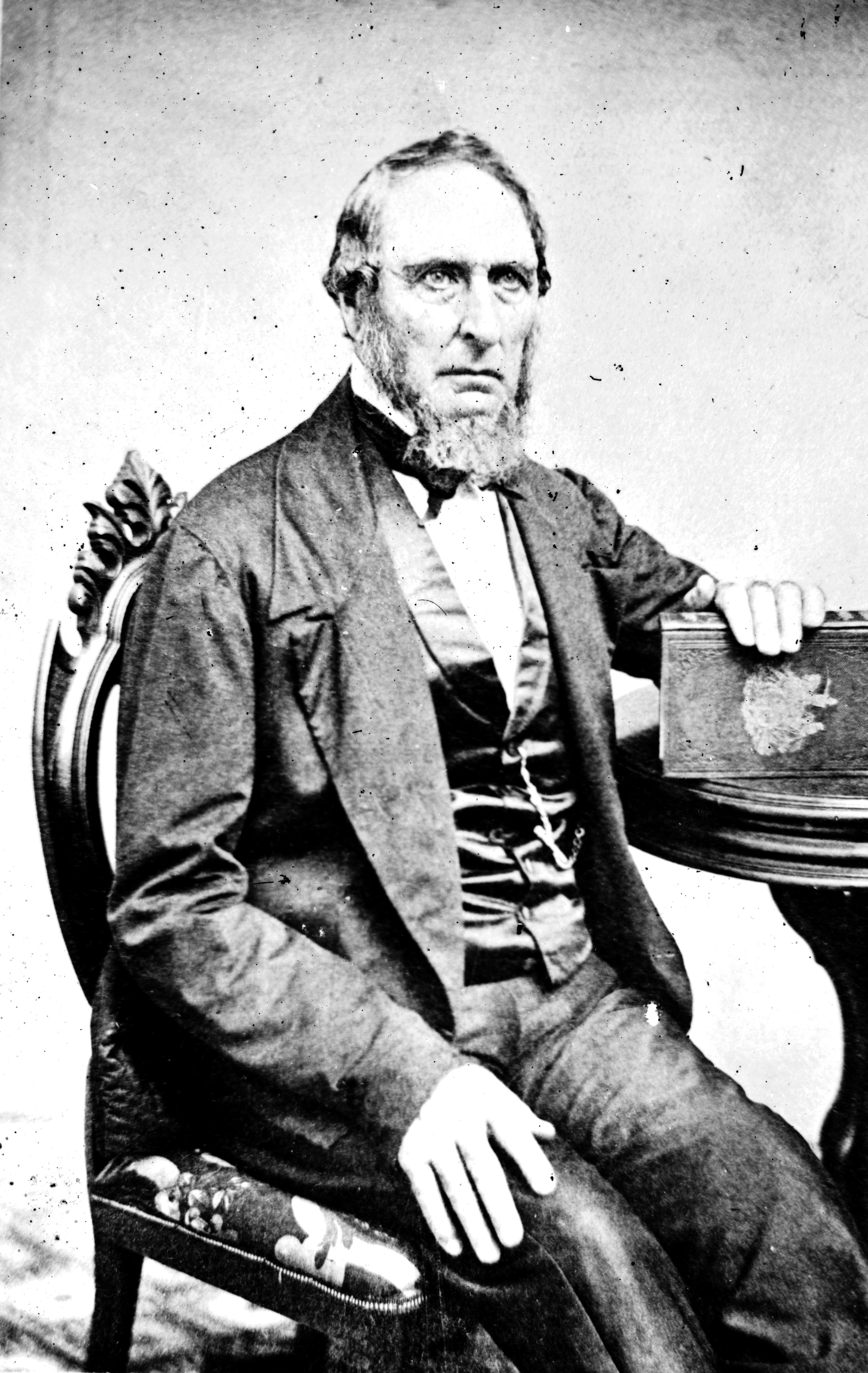
Owen Chase in later life

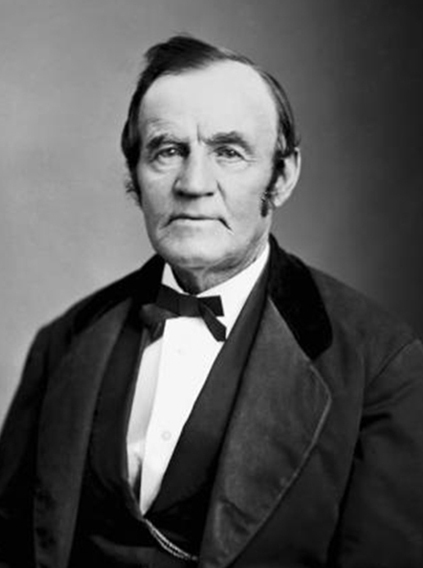
Thomas Nickerson in the 1870s

Pollard returned to sea in early 1822 to captain Two Brothers. She was wrecked on the French Frigate Shoals to the northwest of the Sandwich Islands during Pollard's first voyage as her captain. The crew, which included Nickerson and Ramsdell, took to two whaleboats and were picked up the following day by the whaleship Martha, which had been sailing with them. This wreck was to end Pollard's whaling career; he was considered a doomed captain, or "Jonah", whom no whaleship owner would trust with a vessel. After one voyage aboard a merchant vessel, he retired from the sea and became a night watchman on Nantucket. Every year on November 20, the anniversary of the sinking of Essex, he would lock himself in his room and observe a fast. He died in Nantucket on January 7, 1870, aged 78.

Chase returned to Nantucket on June 11, 1821, to find he had a 14-month-old daughter he had never met. Four months later he had completed an account of the disaster, the Narrative of the Most Extraordinary and Distressing Shipwreck of the Whale-Ship Essex; Herman Melville used it as one of the inspirations for his 1851 novel Moby-Dick. Chase then sailed as first mate on the whaleship Florida, returning to Nantucket in 1823. His wife died after the birth of their third child, and he married the widow of former Essex mate Matthew Joy. He then captained the New Bedford whaleship Winslow and the Nantucket whaleship Charles Carroll, in which he owned a share. Chase married again after the death of his second wife, only to divorce his third wife when he found out she had given birth sixteen months after he had last seen her, although he subsequently brought up the child as his own. In September 1840, two months after the divorce was finalized, he married for the fourth and final time and retired from whaling. Haunted by memories of his ordeal, Chase suffered headaches and nightmares and began hiding food in his attic. He spent a period of about eight years in Quaise Asylum on the island. He died in Nantucket on March 7, 1869, aged 73.

Lawrence captained the whaleships Dromo and Huron before retiring and buying a small farm at Siasconset on Nantucket. He died on Nantucket on March 28, 1879, aged 80.

Ramsdell captained the whaleship General Jackson. He died on Nantucket on July 8, 1866, aged 62.

Nickerson became a captain in the merchant service and moved to Brooklyn, New York. Late in his life he returned to Nantucket, where he ran a boarding house for summer visitors and wrote an account of the sinking, titled The Loss of the Ship "Essex" Sunk by a Whale and the Ordeal of the Crew in Open Boats. Nickerson wrote this account fifty-six years after the sinking, in 1876, and it was lost until 1960; the Nantucket Historical Association published it in 1984. He died in February 1883, aged 77.

The three men, Chappel, Weeks and Wright, who had been rescued from Henderson Island continued to work as crew members of their rescue ship Surry before making their way back to England and the United States. Chappel retired from sailing and became a missionary; he died of plague fever in Timor at an unknown date. Wright was lost at sea in a hurricane in the West Indies about 1834. Weeks became a captain and retired to Cape Cod, where he died on September 12, 1887, having outlived the rest of the Essex survivors.

== Cultural works ==
As well as inspiring much of American author Herman Melville's classic 1851 novel Moby-Dick, the story of the Essex tragedy has been dramatized in film, television, music, and poetry:

- The dramatized documentary Revenge of the Whale (2001), was produced and broadcast on September 7, 2001, by NBC.
- The television movie The Whale (2013) was broadcast on BBC One on December 22, wherein an elderly Thomas Nickerson (played by Martin Sheen) recounted the events of Essex. Charles Furness played the younger Nickerson, Jonas Armstrong played Owen Chase, and Adam Rayner played Captain Pollard.
- The 2015 film In The Heart of the Sea, directed by Ron Howard, was based on Nathaniel Philbrick's book of the same name. Chris Hemsworth starred as Owen Chase and Benjamin Walker as Captain Pollard. Brendan Gleeson and Tom Holland portrayed the elder and younger Nickerson, respectively.
- Amanda Gorman's poetry collection Call Us What We Carry includes a visual poem about the sinking of the Essex.

== See also ==
- Cannibalism at sea
- R v Dudley and Stephens (1884), a case involving cannibalism out of necessity
- French frigate Méduse
- List of incidents of cannibalism
- List of people who disappeared mysteriously at sea

== Sources ==
- Chase, Owen (1821). Narrative of the Most Extraordinary and Distressing Shipwreck of the Whale-Ship Essex. New York: WB Gilley. OCLC 12217894. Archived from the original on November 30, 2014. republished in 1965 as Chase, Owen (1965). The Wreck of the Whaleship Essex. Harcourt, Brace & World, Inc.
- Heffernan, Thomas Farel (1990) [1981]. Stove by a Whale: Owen Chase and the Essex. Middletown, CT: Wesleyan University Press. ISBN 0-8195-6244-0.
- Philbrick, Nathaniel (2001). In the Heart of the Sea: The Tragedy of the Whaleship Essex. New York: Penguin Books. ISBN 0-14-100182-8. OCLC 46949818.
