= Nathaniel Philbrick =

American author

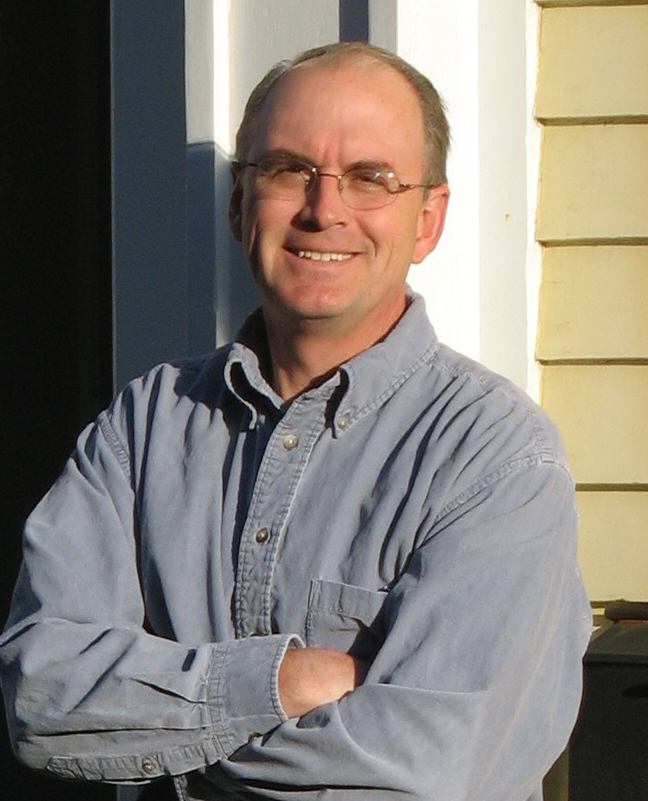
- Philbrick in 2004
- Born: June 11, 1956 (age 70); Boston, Massachusetts, United States
- Education: Brown University (BA); Duke University (MA)
- Occupations: Author, historian
- Spouse: Melissa Douthart Philbrick
- Children: 2
- Writing career
- Period: 1984–present

Nathaniel Philbrick (born June 11, 1956) is an American author of history, winner of the National Book Award, and a finalist for the Pulitzer Prize. His maritime history, In the Heart of the Sea: The Tragedy of the Whaleship Essex, based on what inspired Herman Melville to author Moby-Dick, won the 2000 National Book Award for Nonfiction and was adapted as a film in 2015.

== Early life and education ==
Philbrick was born on June 11, 1956, in Boston, Massachusetts, the son of Marianne (Dennis) and Thomas Philbrick, an English professor. He grew up in Pittsburgh, Pennsylvania.

Philbrick attended Linden Elementary School and graduated from Taylor Allderdice High School in Pittsburgh, Pennsylvania.

He earned a BA in English from Brown University and an MA in American literature from Duke University, where he was a James B. Duke Fellow.

Philbrick was Brown University's first Intercollegiate All-American sailor in 1978. The same year, he won the Sunfish North Americans in Barrington, Rhode Island.

== Career ==
Following graduate school, Philbrick worked as an editor at Sailing World magazine for four years and then as a freelancer for a number of years, during which time he was the primary caregiver for his two children while writing and editing several books about sailing, including The Passionate Sailor, Second Wind and Yaahting: A Parody.

In 1994, he published his first book about the history of Nantucket, Away Off Shore, followed in 1998 by a study of the Nantucket's native legacy, Abram’s Eyes. He is the founding director of Nantucket's Egan Maritime Institute and is a research fellow at the Nantucket Historical Association and a leading authority on the history of Nantucket, Massachusetts.

== Personal life ==
Philbrick is married to Melissa Douthart Philbrick, former executive director of Remain Nantucket, with whom he has two children. They moved to Nantucket in 1986.

== Works ==
External videos
- Presentation by Philbrick on In the Heart of the Sea, June 23, 2000, C-SPAN
- Presentation by Philbrick on In the Heart of the Sea, May 8, 2001, C-SPAN
- Booknotes interview with Philbrick on Sea of Glory, January 25, 2004, C-SPAN
- Discussion with Philbrick on Sea of Glory, January 14, 2004, C-SPAN
- Presentation by Philbrick on Sea of Glory, October 9, 2004, C-SPAN
- Presentation by Philbrick on Mayflower, June 8, 2006, C-SPAN
- Presentation by Philbrick on Mayflower, September 30, 2006, C-SPAN
- Presentation by Philbrick on The Last Stand, May 21, 2010, C-SPAN
- Presentation by Philbrick on Bunker Hill, May 1, 2013, C-SPAN
- Presentation by Philbrick on Valiant Ambition, May 10, 2016, C-SPAN
- Presentation by Philbrick on In the Hurricane's Eye, October 18, 2018, C-SPAN

=== Nonfiction ===
- Yaahting: A Parody. 1984.
- The Passionate Sailor. Contemporary Press, 1987.
- Away Off Shore: Nantucket Island and Its People, 1602-1890. Penguin, 1993. ISBN 978-0143120124
- Abram's Eyes: The Native American Legacy of Nantucket Island. Mill Hill Press, 1998.
- Second Wind: A Sunfish Sailor's Odyssey. Mill Hill Press, 1999.
- In the Heart of the Sea: The Tragedy of the Whaleship Essex. Penguin, 1999. ISBN 0-14-100182-8
- Sea of Glory: America's Voyage of Discovery: the U.S. Exploring Expedition, 1838-1842. New York: Viking, 2001. ISBN 067003231X OCLC 52086279
- Revenge of the Whale: The True Story of the Whaleship Essex. Putnam Juvenile, 2002.
- Mayflower: A Story of Courage, Community, and War. New York: Viking, 2006. ISBN 0-670-03760-5 OCLC 62766154
- The Mayflower and the Pilgrims' New World: The Story of Plymouth Colony for Young Readers. Putnam Juvenile, 2006.
- The Last Stand: Custer, Sitting Bull, and the Battle of the Little Bighorn. New York: Viking, 2010. ISBN 0670021725 OCLC 456171728
- Why Read Moby Dick? New York: Viking, 2010. ISBN 978-0670022991
- Bunker Hill: a City, a Siege, a Revolution. New York: Viking, 2013. ISBN 0-670-02544-5 OCLC 818953755
- Valiant Ambition: George Washington, Benedict Arnold, and the Fate of the American Revolution New York: Viking, 2016. ISBN 978-0525426783
- In the Hurricane's Eye: The Genius of George Washington and the Victory at Yorktown, 2018.
- Travels with George: In Search of Washington and His Legacy, New York: Viking, 2021. ISBN 978-0525562177
- The Rush: California Gold, the Civil War, and the Making of the Modern World, New York: Viking, 2026. ISBN 978-0525562245

== Adaptations ==
In the Heart of the Sea is the basis of the Warner Bros. motion picture of the same name, directed by Ron Howard and starring Chris Hemsworth, Benjamin Walker, Ben Whishaw, Cillian Murphy, Brendan Gleeson, and Tom Holland, released in December 2015. The book also inspired a 2001 Dateline special on NBC as well as the 2010 two-hour PBS American Experience film "Into the Deep" by Ric Burns.

Bunker Hill has been optioned by Warner Bros. for feature film adaptation with Ben Affleck attached to direct. In 2016, screenwriter Aaron Stockard (The Town, Gone Baby Gone) was signed to the project.

== See also ==
- Frank Philbrick
- Rodman Philbrick
- Stephen Philbrick

== Sources ==
- Kakutani, Michiko (June 3, 2010). "The Last Stand? Yes. The Last Word? Never". The New York Times.
- Barcott, Bruce (June 10, 2010). "Men on Horseback". review. New York Times Sunday Book Review.
- Percelay, Bruce (May 25, 2010). "Beyond Nantucket with Nathaniel Philbrick". N Magazine.
