= Nantucket Film Festival =

American film festival

- Location: Nantucket, Massachusetts, United States
- Founded: 1996
- Festival date: Late June
- Language: International
- Website: nantucketfilmfestival.org

The Nantucket Film Festival is a film festival founded in 1996 which focuses on screenwriting. Board members include Donick Cary, Nancy Dubac, Chris Matthews, Kathleen Matthews, Ben Stiller, and Tom Scott.

== History ==
The Nantucket Film Festival was founded in 1996 by siblings Jill and Jonathan Burkhart, who grew up on the island. In 1997, Mystelle Brabbée joined them and now serves as executive director. Jenifer Estess was also involved in the festival's founding.

== The Nantucket Film Festival Screenwriters Tribute ==
The NFF Screenwriters Tribute is a celebration of a noted screenwriter. This event is hosted by Brian Williams, NFF Board member and NBC News anchor.

== Late Night Storytelling ==
In this event Festival attendees tell a five-minute story, based on a chosen theme. Writers, actors, filmmakers or Nantucketers, tell their tales without the benefit of notes or scripts.

== The All-Star Comedy Roundtable ==
This event hosted by Ben Stiller is a moderated conversation event featuring comedians.

== Nantucket Film Festival Awards ==
The NFF Official Juries announced in May and the NFF Official Awards are presented to recipients on the last day of the festival in June. The NFF Showtime Tony Cox Screenplay competitions award prizes to Feature Screenplay, Short Screenplay, and TV Pilots.

== The Screenwriters Colony ==
The Screenwriters Colony is a month long, all-expenses-paid event on the island of Nantucket. Writers are invited to work on their screenplay projects with guidance from more experienced people. Participating writers live together at Almanack Farm, on the edge of Nantucket's cranberry bog conservation land.

== Year-round ==
The Festival's parent organization, the Nantucket Film Foundation, features off-season screening with the Nantucket Dreamland Foundation including NFF Now and the Summer Film Screenings. The NFF Teen View program is a filmmaking workshop series and intensive course free to Nantucket teenagers.
