= Polpis, Massachusetts =

Polpis
- Village
- Location within the state of Massachusetts
- Coordinates: 41°17′54″N 70°0′46″W
- Country: United States
- State: Massachusetts
- County: Nantucket
- Elevation: 7 ft (2.1 m)
- Time zone: UTC-5 (Eastern (EST))
  - Summer (DST): UTC-4 (EDT)
- GNIS feature ID: 616949

Polpis (also Milton Poadpis or Podpis) is a village in Nantucket, Massachusetts, United States. Its elevation is 7 feet (2 m). The different spellings of its name led the Board on Geographic Names to designate its official spelling in 1900. The community lies 3.5 miles (5.5 km) northwest of Siasconset.
