= Dorcas Honorable =

Nantucket Island's last indigenous inhabitant of Wampanoag origin

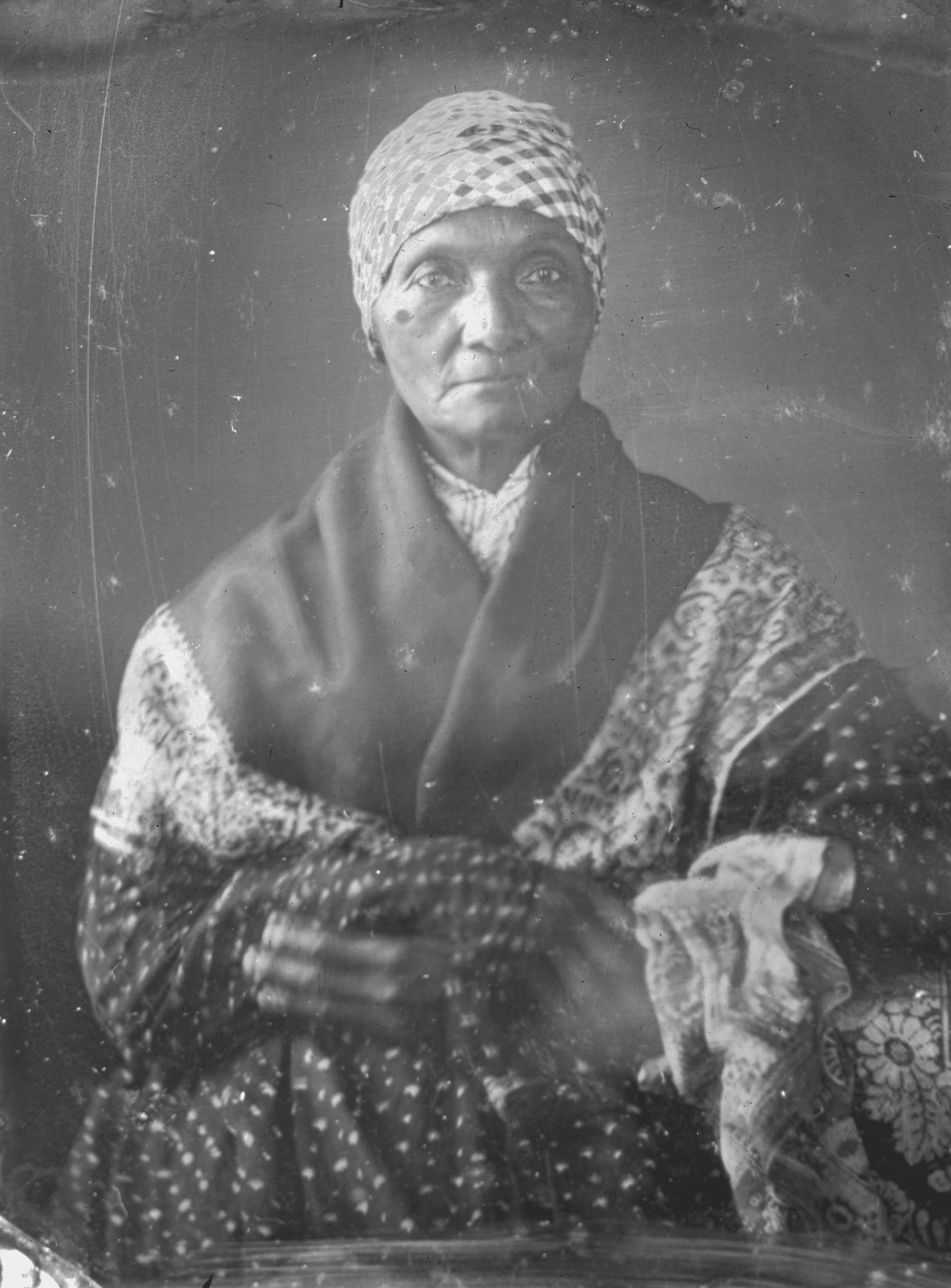
- Dorcas Honorable
- Born: Dorcas Esop c. 1770; Nantucket, Massachusetts, United States
- Died: 1855 (aged 84–85); Nantucket, Massachusetts, United States
- Citizenship: Wampanoag
- Known for: Nantucket's last Native American

Dorcas Esop Honorable (c. 1770 – 1855) was - controversially - said to be Nantucket Island's last Nantucket Wampanoag inhabitant. She was of Wampanoag origin, and was raised speaking the Massachusett language.

== History ==
Born circa 1770, Dorcas Esop was the daughter of Sarah Tashama Esop, daughter of Benjamin Tashama. Dorcas's grandfather Benjamin was a sachem, teacher, and preacher who opened a school for Wampanoag children. Dorcas was born during the American Revolution, just ten years after an illness brought by Europeans killed 222 of 358 Wampanoags on Nantucket.

Unlike her acquaintance Abram Quary, who was generally recognized as the second-to-last Wampanoag on Nantucket and the last male native to the island, Dorcas Honorable was known to have remained out of public knowledge during her lifetime, particularly after the death of her mother. Dorcas worked as a domestic and worshipped as a Baptist Christian.

Esop was married several times. In 1792, she was married to Isaac Freeman, but by 1800, she had likely gone back to live with her mother Sarah, because a census from 1800 shows that Sarah ran a household of two people. Dorcas would remarry in 1801 to Bill Williams, in 1808 to Henry Mooers, in 1817 to John Sip, and in 1820 to Thomas Honorable. It remains obscure whether her husbands were Indigenous or non-Indigenous. It is also unclear why she was married so many times in a period of thirty years.

Some historical records indicate that Dorcas's fourth husband, John Sip, was the victim of a violent assault in Nantucket's New Guinea community, but his marriage to Dorcas is the last record of him in Nantucket's recorded history.

Dorcas had her only known child with Thomas Honorable. Their child was a daughter named Emmeline. By 1830, it would appear that Dorcas and Thomas Honorable were living in New Guinea, but they returned to Nantucket in 1850, around the time that Dorcas was widowed. Dorcas lived the rest of her life in the household of Thaddeus Coffin on Nantucket.

After Abram Quary's death in the late months of 1854, it was generally believed that the Native American race on Nantucket had gone extinct within 100 years of European arrival. But Dorcas died in the early months of 1855, and it was then that Europeans acknowledged her as the last Indigenous Nantucketer. A Baptist congregational ceremony was held for Dorcas's death at her church.
