= Nantucket during the American Revolutionary War era =

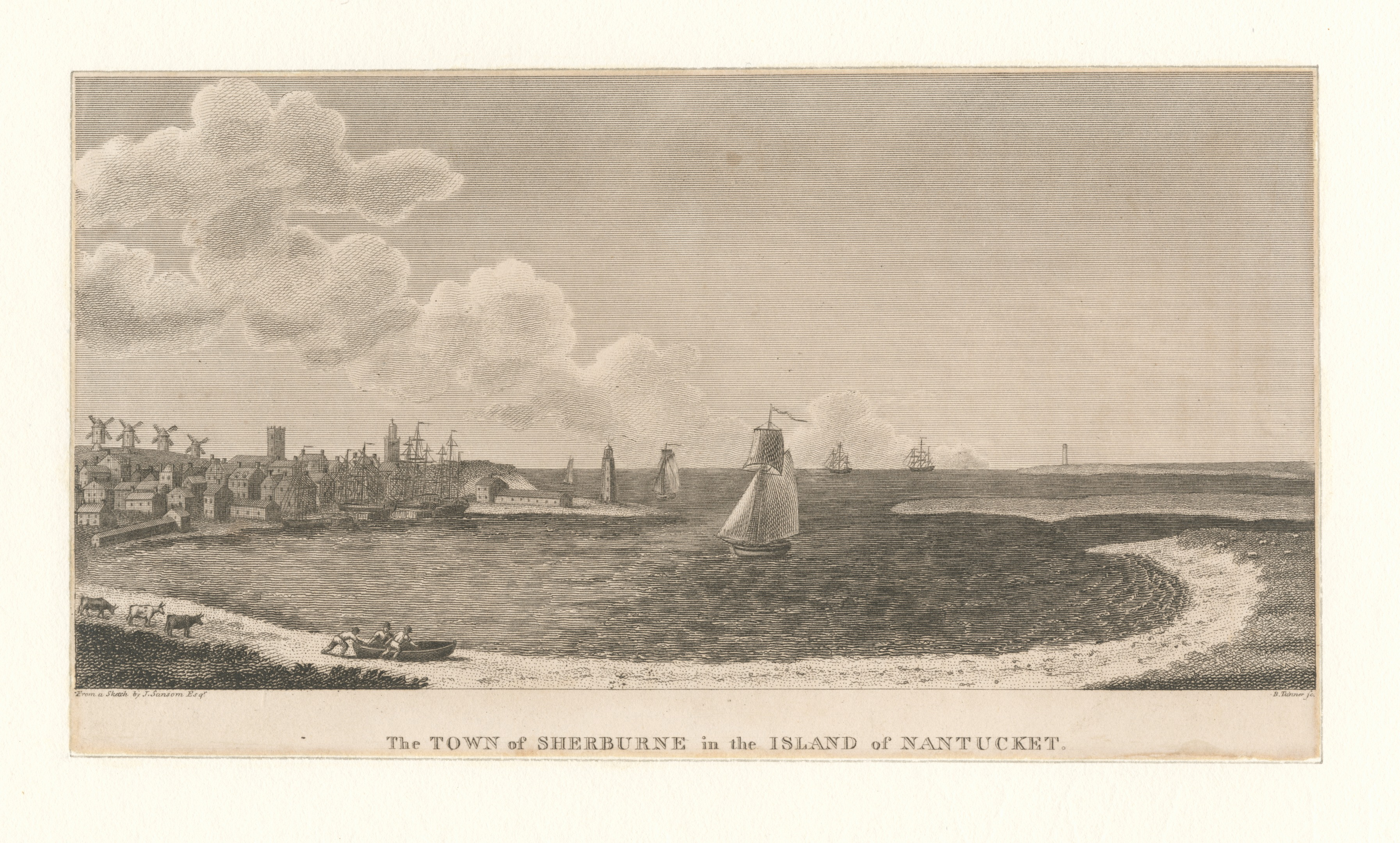
Port of Nantucket in 1811

The citizens of Nantucket during the American Revolutionary War era relied on whaling, industries that supported whaling, and the trade in oil that resulted from that industry. Because most of this trade was with England, the leading citizens of Nantucket chose to be neutral during the American Revolutionary War, siding neither with those who supported revolution nor with the British Crown, in order to maintain the viability of the island's economy. The Quaker culture of pacifism was a secondary cause of the island's non-participation in revolutionary activities.

== Background ==
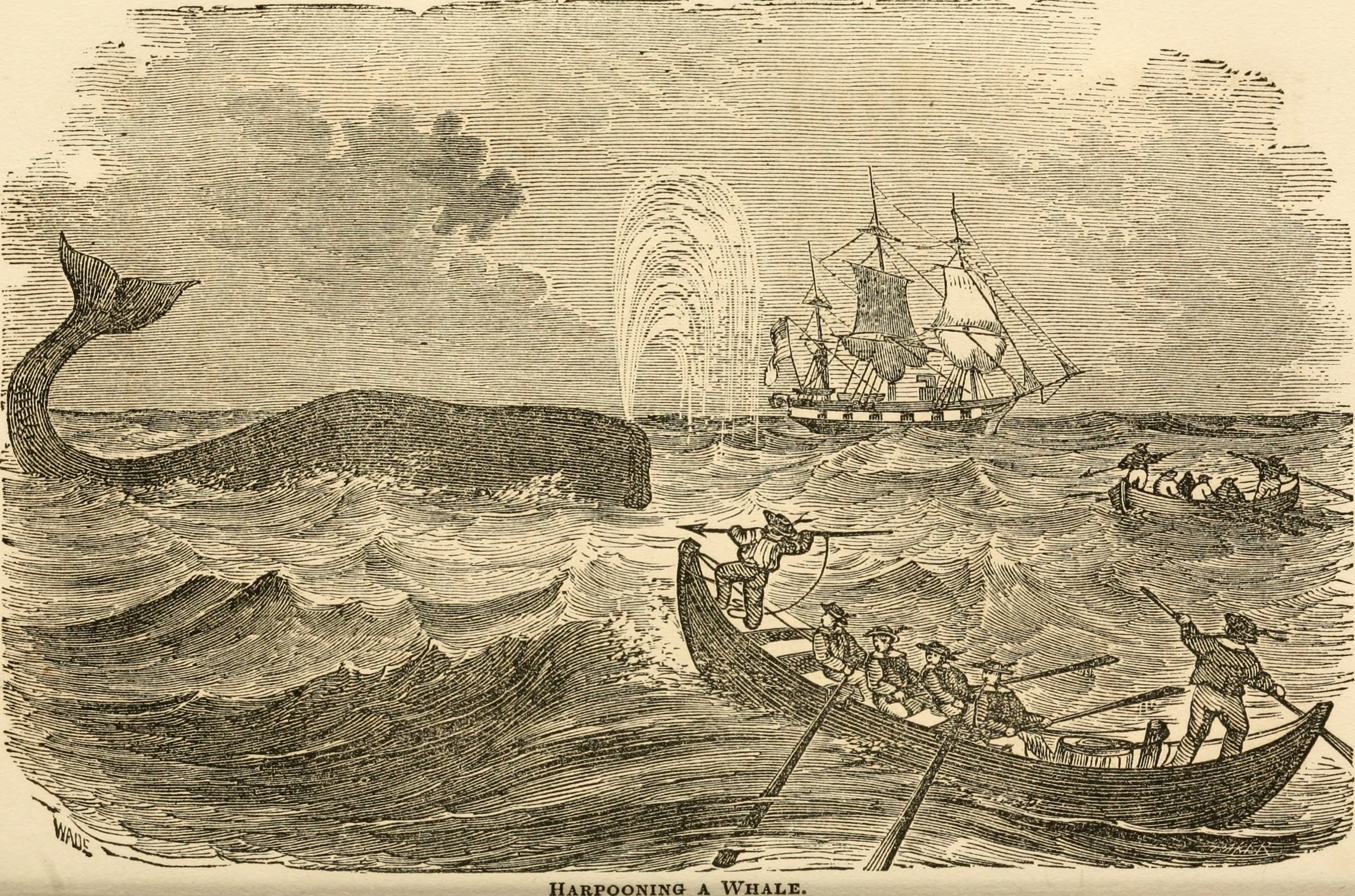
Whaling in the early colonial era

Nantucket is an island located 14 miles (20 km) south of Cape Cod, Massachusetts. When the English explorer Bartholomew Gosnold first sighted Nantucket in 1602, it was home to some 3,000 Native Americans. The island was purchased by the English settler Thomas Mayhew in 1641. Upon receiving the island, Mayhew kept a tenth of it for himself and sold the remaining land to fellow settlers living in Salisbury, Massachusetts for "thirty pounds... and also two beaver hats, one for myself, and one for my wife." The island's whaling industry soon become one of the most prominent in colonial America.

=== Whaling ===
The Nantucket Historical Association notes that inhabitants of the island may have seen right whales washing ashore on their beaches as early as the 1690s, and it is confirmed that by 1715, Nantucketers realized that there were sperm whales in those waters as well.

==== Demand for oils ====
There was high demand for quality oils within the colonies and in Europe, but particularly in London, which was the most industrialized European city of the period. London had experienced the effects of industrialization during the beginning of the century, and they experienced both the good and the bad of the urbanization and modernization that came with it. A rise in crime rates in London was blamed in part on the city's widespread lack of street lights, which soon became chief among the concerns and prompted the creation of a program to counteract that issue in 1736. Sperm oils and their lubricant byproducts were sought after, as they were odorless, gave the "clearest and brightest flame," and were of comparable price with vegetable oils.

==== Development of whaling and related industries ====
Various ancillary industries on Nantucket such as shipbuilding and spermaceti processing also emerged to support the growth of this new burgeoning island economy. Recognizing their fortunate geographic location and in need of a good living, large numbers of these early settlers began to hunt sperm whales by the early 1700s. Herman Melville wrote in Moby Dick that "thus have these Nantucketers overrun and conquered the watery world like so many Alexanders." By the time the American Revolution began in 1775, the island had become the premier whaling economy on the Eastern Seaboard and had developed into a crucial mercantile center of the British Empire.

=== Quaker population ===
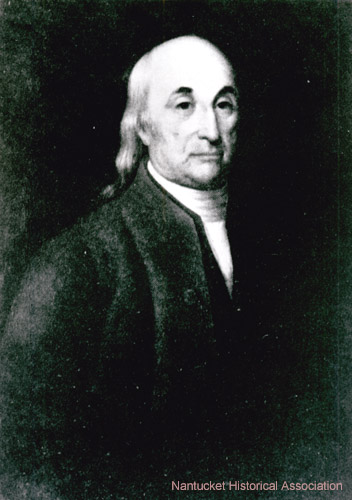
William Rotch—Nantucket envoy to negotiate Nantucket's neutrality

Inhabitants of early Nantucket were largely drawn to the island from the surrounding rural areas of New England, even though until 1692 the lands were still part Dukes Country in New York State. Due to the island's Wampanoag origin, it developed a liberal and accepting social culture, which prompted a large influx of Quakers who were seeking to escape religious persecution in Great Britain. Known collectively as the Society of Friends, these Quakers became some of Nantucket's most influential founding families and more often than not brought their cultural majority to bear in local politics.

=== Prominent individuals ===
William Rotch and Timothy Folger were influential in negotiating the outcome of Nantucket's trading prospects.

==== William Rotch ====
Of all the individuals on Nantucket during the situation in 1775, few had more influence on local affairs than William Rotch (1734-1828). Rotch was born on the island in 1734, and had inherited considerable wealth from his father Joseph. This inheritance, which Rotch split with his brother Francis, included two major shipping vessels, the Bedford and the Dartmouth; the latter is famous for being the ship from which a considerable wealth of tea was flung during the Boston Tea Party in 1773.

==== Timothy Folger ====
Timothy Folger was a prominent businessman on Nantucket during the Revolutionary War period and was the member of one of Massachusetts' most successful early American families. He was a successful business man, a captain, and a member of the groups that were sent to New York City and Philadelphia to discuss neutrality during the war. Folger was a three-time representative to both Massachusetts and New York from 1779-1782.

=== Contemporary observations ===
French explorer St. John de Crevecoeur, who visited Nantucket in the early 1770s and mentioned it repeatedly in his 1782 book Letters to an American Farmer, writing of the economic success that "what has happened here has and will happen everywhere else." It is also referenced in Thomas Jefferson's 1788 book Observations on the Whale-Fishery, which he wrote as Minister to France following the conclusion of the Revolutionary War in 1783, and which describes in detail the success of "Nantuckois" in the American whaling industry during the decades after the war.

== Prelude to revolution ==
In 1775, Nantucket was an important part of the Massachusetts Bay Colony, which was a locus of revolutionary sentiment. The colony had been governed by a form of colonial martial law for many months. Nantucket lacked military defenses and was isolated from the Massachusetts mainland. If the islanders proclaimed loyalty to either the Crown or to the colony, the other side could have easily occupied the island. Acts passed by the British Parliament, the importance of the island's trade with Britain, and the tendency of influential Quakers towards pacifism set the stage for neutrality between the colony and the mother country.

=== Acts of Parliament ===
The historian Nathaniel Philbrick wrote that "during the winter and spring of 1775, as Britain and her colonies teetered on the brink of war, Nantucket Island was mentioned repeatedly in the halls of Parliament," highlighting that Britain valued Nantucket's whaling exports at a time when colonists were deciding whether to revolt against Britain. Parliament had enacted measures, including the Massachusetts Bay Restraining Bill of 1774, that prohibited trade out of Boston and banned the use of fisheries on the East Coast and in Newfoundland, but exempted Nantucket. At the time, half of Massachusetts' total whaling vessels contained half of the seamen manning those vessels were based in Nantucket and had the production capacity to collect and churn out over 30,000 barrels of oil in a single calendar year. Siding with the colonists against the Crown would have invited Nantucket's inclusion in the punitive acts of Parliament and destroyed the island's fisheries.

=== The importance of trade ===
Since the island's economy depended on the oil trade with London, it was important to maintain that connection. The success of the island's commercial ventures, including "merchants, blacksmiths, coopers, boat-builders, riggers, sailmakers, oil and candle manufacturers, carpenters, seamen, and similar intertwining occupations" was primarily based on trans-Atlantic trade. British merchants recognized the importance of this trade and acted quickly to protect it. Quaker sympathizer and Scottish merchant, Robert Barclay, testified before Parliament as early as 1774 that Nantucket's supply of spermaceti oil was crucial for London's economy, and that neutrality might allow trade with the island to bypass the rebellious factions in Boston and be conducted directly with England.

=== Quaker pacifism ===
In addition to economic factors, the pacifistic culture of Quakerism factored into Nantucket's decision to adopt a policy of neutrality. The Society of Friends on Nantucket included the Macys, Coffins, Gardners, and Starbucks. It presided over local politics with a pacific character, and "entertained a strong and almost universal opinion that wars are wrong." Historians have cited Quaker beliefs as being, "a powerful factor in their non-partisanship or neutrality was the spirit of non-resistance", noting that their "well-known aversion to war has proved a far better shield to them than fleets and fortifications could have been," as they were "exposed on all sides, without a single fort, arsenal, or military company."

=== Outbreak of revolution ===
By the summer of 1775, Nantucket was feeling pressure from both the Patriots and the Crown. On July 7, 1775, the Provincial Congress in Philadelphia passed a clear statement to cease trade with the British, a resolution stating "that no provisions or necessaries of any kind be exported from any part of this colony to the Island of Nantucket until the inhabitants of said Island shall have given full and sufficient satisfaction to this Congress, or some future House of Representatives, that the provisions they have now by them, has not been and shall not be expended in foreign, but for domestic production." The selectmen of Nantucket defended their commitment to not participating in rebellion—on moral and cultural grounds—in a letter to the Board of Massachusetts on July 14, 1775. It explained that "the inhabitants [of Nantucket] are the greater part, of the people call'd Quakers, whose well known principles of Religion, will not admit of their taking up arms in a military way in any case whatever." The wealth and prosperity that the whaling trade had afforded the island's most prominent merchants and traders was an unspoken factor. One historian noted that, "When the sting came during and following the war, the Nantucket oil magnates demonstrated how little their attachment to a new nation or affection for their island home counted against prospective gain from hunting and processing the whale." These factors formed the basis for favoring neither the British nor the Patriots during the conflict.

== Neutrality ==
By 1776, although the leading citizens of Nantucket had demonstrated their commitment to neutrality in both their actions and their written responses to the Provincial Congress, both sides of the war exerted some pressure to favor them. After some prominent Quaker families moved to the mainland with the onset of hostilities and with them their cordial relations with the British regarding the whale-oil trade. Nantucket sent a committee of Benjamin Tucker, Timothy Folger, William Rotch, and Samuel Starbuck to Newport, Rhode Island and New York City to parlay with British commanders so that trade could continue unmolested. The resulting agreement held that "the depredations would cease, provided the Town of Nantucket would observe strict neutrality". In December 1778, when a British schooner wrecked on the Nantucket coastline, Timothy Folger supplied her crew with small vessels and provisions in order to get them safely to New York. In April 1779, Loyalist troops came to Nantucket with orders not to harm or uproot local citizens, but to "destroy rebel property wherever it be found."

Nantucket's continued trade with the British after the islanders' declaration of neutrality created questions of divided loyalty from the authorities in Massachusetts. As a result, on September 25, 1782 Nantucket convened a town meeting and drafted a letter to the Courts of Massachusetts, which explained the islanders' economic constraints and their desire to remain neutral during the war. Frederick Folger, the town clerk, signed the letter. The letter addressed rumors that Nantucket had continued to trade secretly with New York City. In the following weeks, Rotch and Starbuck were sent as envoys to Philadelphia, where in the winter of 1782 an official Agreement of Neutrality was drafted, signed, and made law. As one scholar noted, "Nantucket struggled through the war and experienced considerable prosperity after the proclamation of peace."
