= Eliza Starbuck Barney =

American Quaker women's rights activist and abolitionist

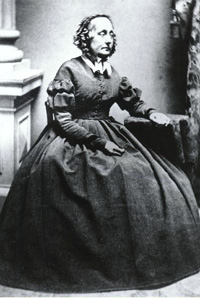
- Born: Eliza Starbuck; April 9, 1802; Nantucket, Massachusetts
- Died: March 18, 1889 (aged 86); Nantucket, Massachusetts
- Occupations: Abolitionist, Suffragist, Historian
- Spouse: Nathaniel Barney

Eliza Starbuck Barney (April 9, 1802 – March 18, 1889) was a Quaker women's rights activist and abolitionist, responsible for handwritten genealogy records that traced the history of more than 40,000 residents of Nantucket, Massachusetts, from the 17th to 19th century. The Eliza Starbuck Barney Genealogical Record, now maintained by the Nantucket Historical Association, has been digitized and is now available online.

== Biography ==
Eliza Starbuck was the third child of Joseph Starbuck and Sally Gardner, a Nantucket family that had become wealthy in the whale oil industry. At 18, Eliza married Nathaniel Barney. Despite their wealth, the couple shared a home with Eliza's sister, Eunice, and her husband William Hadwen. The husbands became business partners, opening a whale oil refinery on the site of the current Nantucket Whaling Museum.

Eliza Starbuck Barney was secretary to Nantucket's Anti-Slavery Society from 1839 to 1840. The families welcomed William Lloyd Garrison and Frederick Douglass to their home at 100 Main Street in 1841 and hosted an anti-slavery meeting; Nathaniel Barney refused his dividends from the New Bedford Railroad to protest its refusal to carry black passengers.

In 1851, Eliza attended the first women's suffrage convention in Massachusetts. Nathaniel and Eliza left Nantucket for Pennsylvania sometime after 1857, and Eliza returned after her husband's death in 1869. Her son, Joseph, built a home for her at 73 Main Street in 1871. It is now known as the Eliza Barney house.

== Genealogy records ==
Barney's collection of genealogical data for residents of Nantucket spanned 1,702 handwritten pages in six 275-page books. The information includes family lineage, births, marriages, deaths, relocations, and deaths at sea. The record begins with the first European settlers in Nantucket, and extended beyond her death into 1912 through the work of her granddaughter. Genealogical information from the books was extracted by Nantucket Historical Association staff and volunteers and is now searchable via an online database. Barney's genealogical record contains some idiosyncratic flourishes, such as appending "Jr." to the names of women with the same names as their mother.
