= Askamaboo =

Wampanoag sachem

- Born: Wampanoag territory, Nantucket, Massachusetts colony
- Title: Sunksqua
- Spouse: Spotso
- Children: Daniel Spatssoo

Askamaboo also spelled Askamapoo or Askommopoo was a Wampanoag Sunksqua, whose territory was on the island Nantucket. She ruled during the late 17th century.

== Life ==
The Wampanoag were semisedentary and lived between fixed sites, moving seasonally within eastern Massachusetts and the islands. Askamaboo was one of many women to become a Sunksqua, typically achieved through property amassed, being the eldest female in line of succession without any brothers or as a widow to a deceased Sachem. Askamaboo's family had gained a large amount of land on Nantucket.

Askamaboo was the daughter of the Sachem Nickanoose and his first, highest ranking wife. Nickanoose gave her hand in marriage to Nantucket Sachem Spotso, with whom she had her son Daniel. Nickanoose's daughter inherited all of his property, an inheritance with lasting legal documentation and witnessed by the Chappaquiddick Sachem Pakeponessoo, and a second Wampanoag named Papumahchohoo. The will was dated to August 18, 1660 by the Nantucket Historical Association.

Though she recognized the importance of literacy, she herself was not literate–the Massachusetts Historical Society has a letter transferring her power of attorney to her son, Daniel Spatssoo, which she needed to have transcribed. Her son would go on to become Sachem after her.

== See also ==
- List of Native American politicians
- Native American women in politics
