= Nantucket Dreamland Foundation =

American non-profit organization

Coordinates: 41°17′5″N 70°5′52.7″W

The Nantucket Dreamland Foundation is a non-profit organization based in Nantucket, Massachusetts. It purchased the 177-year-old Dreamland Theater from Haim Zahavi in October 2007 for 9.8 million dollars.

Since then, the old theater, which hadn't shown a big screen movie in over six years, was dismantled with the plan of incorporating a significant amount of old materials (trusses, windows and other historic elements) into the design and construction of the new theater.

This new design, which has been approved by the Historic District Commission, the Nantucket Planning Board, and the Massachusetts Historical Commission, includes a 330-seat movie theater, a second floor studio theater for smaller events and productions, and an outdoor community space. The building was designed by Catalano Architects of Boston, MA.

Since the acquisition in 2007, hundreds of donors from both on and off the island have contributed over $22M towards the nearly $30M target for this project. At this time, groundbreaking on the new Dreamland Theater was set for the Fall of 2010, with its re-opening planned for the Summer of 2011.

The Dreamland Foundation's Board of Directors consists of several important figures in American commerce. Wendy Schmidt, wife of Google CEO Eric Schmidt, is President of the Board. Other board members include Barry Sternlicht, James Pallotta, part-owner of the Boston Celtics, and Kathy Penske, wife of Roger Penske, among others.
