= Nantucket =

- Consolidated town and county
- Town and County of Nantucket
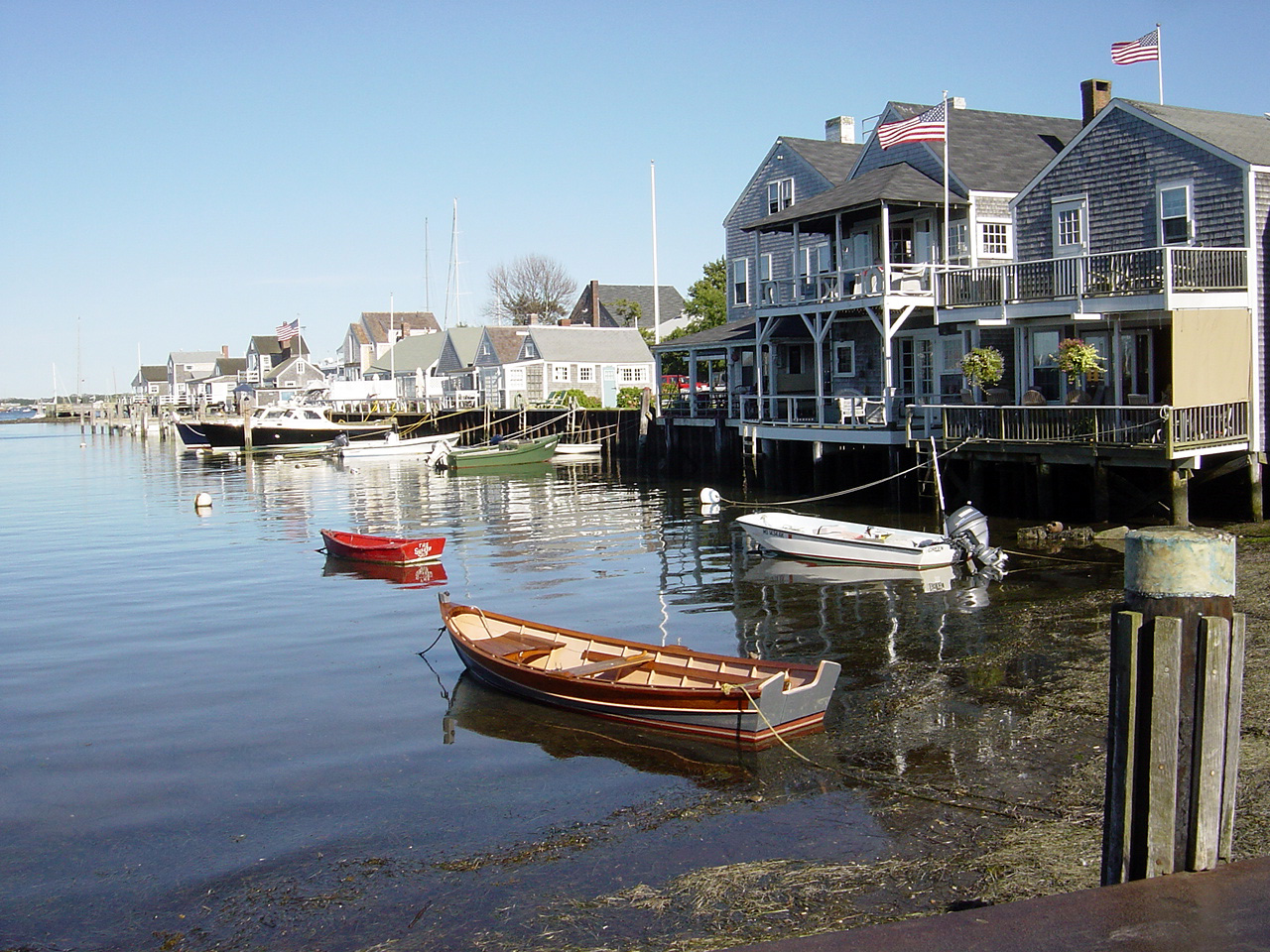

- Flag Seal

- Location of Nantucket in Massachusetts

- Location in the United States Nantucket (the United States)
- Coordinates: 41°16′58″N 70°5′58″W
- Country: United States
- State: Massachusetts
- Settled: 1641
- Incorporated: 1671

Government
  - Type: Open town meeting and consolidated town and county
  - Town Administrator: Libby Gibson

Area
  - Total: 105.3 sq mi (272.6 km^{2})
  - Land: 47.8 sq mi (123.8 km^{2})
  - Water: 57.5 sq mi (148.8 km^{2})
- Elevation: 30 ft (9 m)

Population (2020)
  - Total: 14,255
  - Estimate (2025): 14,758 ▲
  - Density: 298/sq mi (115.1/km^{2})
- Time zone: UTC−5 (Eastern)
  - Summer (DST): UTC−4 (Eastern)
- ZIP Codes: 02554, 02564, 02584
- Area code: 508
- FIPS code: 25-43790
- GNIS feature ID: 0619376
- Website: nantucket-ma.gov

Nantucket (/ˌnænˈtʌkɪt/) is an island in Massachusetts, United States, about 30 miles (48 km) south of the Cape Cod peninsula. Together with the small islands of Tuckernuck and Muskeget, it constitutes the Town and County of Nantucket, a combined county/town government. Nantucket is the southeasternmost town in Massachusetts. The name "Nantucket" is adapted from similar Algonquian names for the island.

Nantucket is a tourist destination and summer colony. Due to an influx of tourists and seasonal residents, the population of the island increases to around 80,000 during the summer months. The average sale price for a single-family home was $2.3 million in the first quarter of 2018.

The National Park Service cites Nantucket, designated a National Historic Landmark District in 1966, as being the "finest surviving architectural and environmental example of a late 18th- and early 19th-century New England seaport town."

== History ==
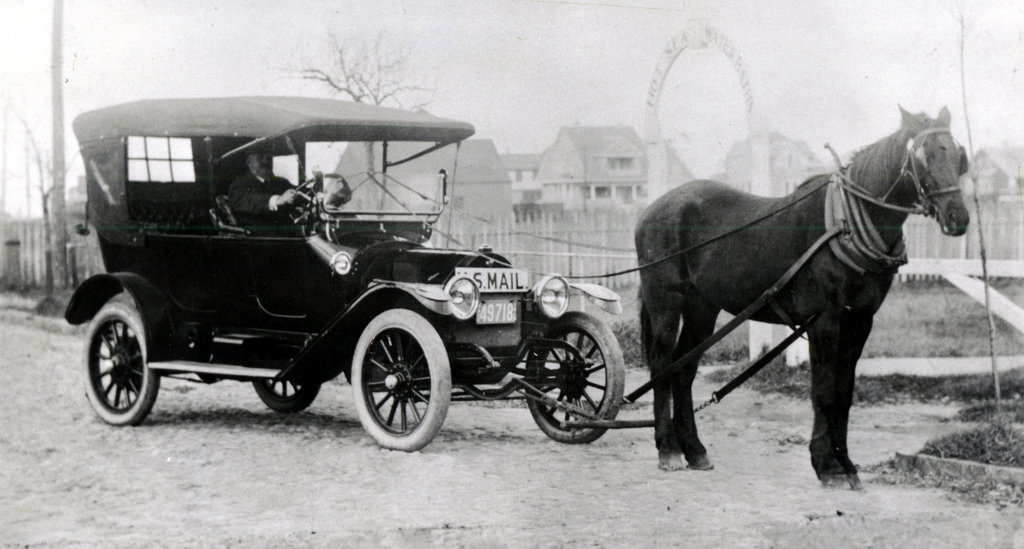
Clinton Folger, mail carrier for Nantucket, towed his car to the state highway for driving to Siasconset, in observance of an early 20th-century ban on automobiles on town roads.

1870s street scene on Nantucket

=== Etymology ===
Nantucket probably takes its name from a Wampanoag word, transliterated variously as natocke, nantaticu, nantican, nautica or natockete, which is part of Wampanoag lore about the creation of Martha's Vineyard and Nantucket. The meaning of the term is uncertain, although according to the Encyclopædia Britannica it may have meant "far away island" or "sandy, sterile soil tempting no one". Wampanoag is an Eastern Algonquian language of southern New England. The Nehantucket (known to Europeans as the Niantic) were an Algonquin-speaking people of the area.

Nantucket's nickname, "The Little Grey Lady of the Sea", refers to the island as it appears from the ocean when it is fog-bound.

=== European colonization ===
The earliest European colonial settlement in the region was established on the neighboring island of Martha's Vineyard by the English-born merchant Thomas Mayhew. In 1641, Mayhew secured Martha's Vineyard, Nantucket, the Elizabeth Islands, and other islands in the region as a proprietary colony from Sir Ferdinando Gorges and the Earl of Stirling. Mayhew led several families to settle the region, establishing several treaties with the indigenous inhabitants of Nantucket, the Wampanoag people. These treaties helped prevent the region from becoming embroiled in King Philip's War. The growing population of settlers welcomed seasonal groups of other Native American tribes who traveled to the island to fish and later harvest whales that washed up on shore. Nantucket was officially part of Dukes County, New York, until October 17, 1691, when the charter for the newly formed Province of Massachusetts Bay was signed. Following the arrival of the new Royal Governor on May 14, 1692, to effectuate the new government, Nantucket County was partitioned from Dukes County, Massachusetts in 1695.

=== Nantucket settlers ===
European settlement of Nantucket did not begin in earnest until 1659, when Thomas Mayhew sold nine-tenths of his interest to a group of investors, led by Tristram Coffin, "for the sum of thirty pounds (equal to £4,912 today) also two beaver hats, one for myself, and one for my wife".

The nine original purchasers were Tristram Coffin, Peter Coffin, Thomas Macy (an ancestor of William H. Macy), Christopher Hussey, Richard Swain, Thomas Barnard, Stephen Greenleaf, John Swain and William Pile. Mayhew and the nine purchasers then each took on partners in the venture. These additional shareholders were Tristram Coffin Junior, James Coffin, John Smith, Robert Pike, Thomas Look, Robert Barnard, Edward Starbuck, Thomas Coleman, John Bishop and Thomas Mayhew Junior. These twenty men and their heirs were the Proprietors.

Anxious to add to their number and to bring tradesmen to the island, the total number of shares was increased to twenty-seven. The original purchasers needed the assistance of tradesmen who were skilled in the arts of weaving, milling, building and other pursuits and selected men who were given half a share provided that they lived on Nantucket and carried on their trade for at least three years. By 1667, twenty-seven shares had been divided among 31 owners. Seamen and tradesmen who settled in Nantucket included Richard Gardner (arrived 1667) and Capt. John Gardner (arrived 1672), sons of Thomas Gardner. The first settlers focused on farming and raising sheep, but overgrazing and the growing number of farms made these activities untenable, and the islanders soon began turning to the sea for a living.

=== Sherburne ===
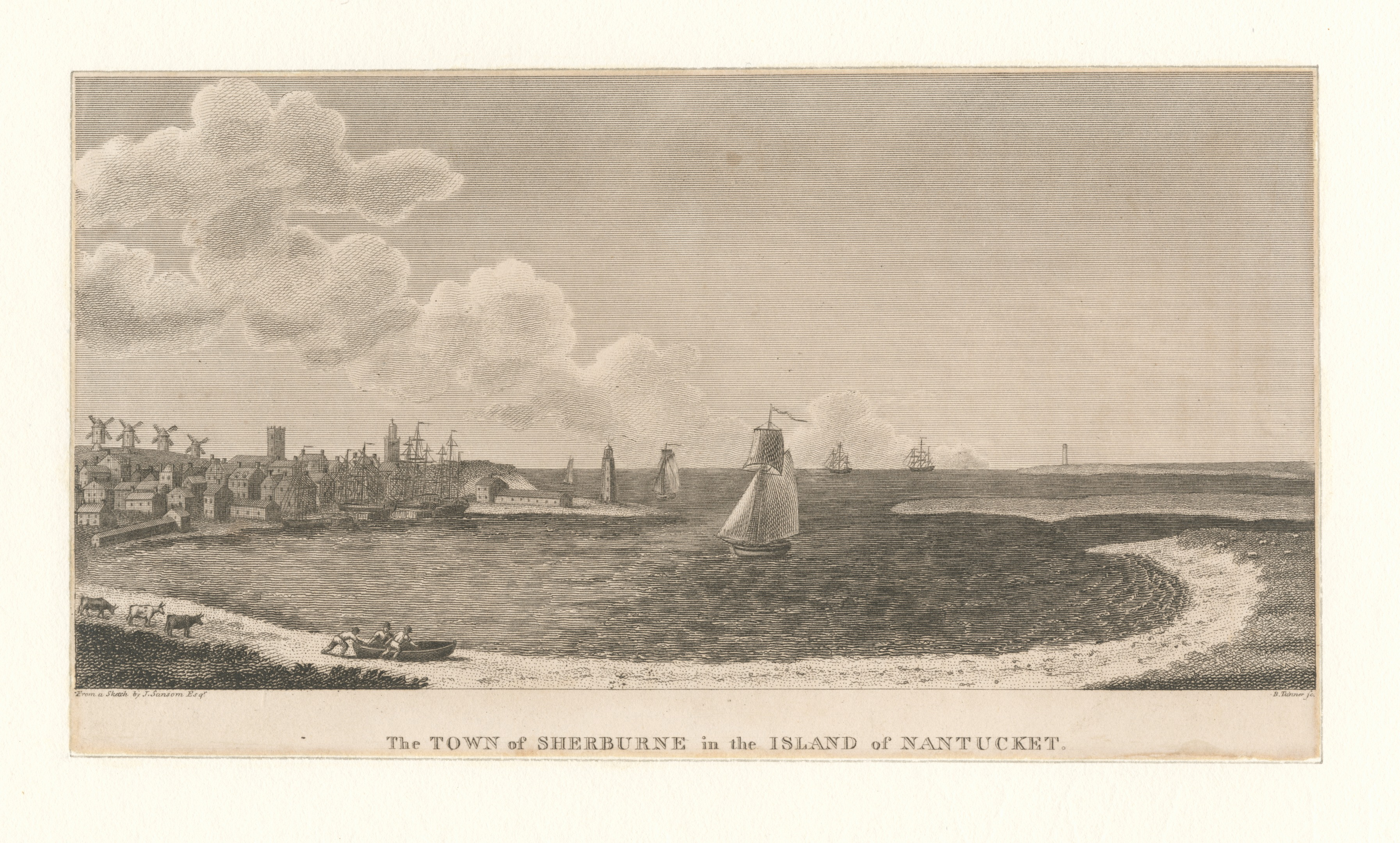
The town on Nantucket Island, when it was still called Sherburne, in 1775

Before 1795, the town on the island was called Sherburne. The original settlement was near Capaum Pond. At that time, the pond was a small harbor whose entrance silted up, forcing the settlers to dismantle their houses and move them northeast by two miles to the present location. On June 8, 1795, the bill proposed by Micajah Coffin to change the town's name to the "Town of Nantucket" was endorsed and signed by Governor Samuel Adams to officially change the town name.

=== New Guinea ===
The early settlers brought enslaved African Americans to Nantucket. Although slavery was not abolished on the island until 1773, earlier in the century freed African Americans established a neighbourhood called New Guinea (later Newtown) on the south-west outskirts of the main town, near the windmills on Mill Hill. The community thrived during the 18th and 19th centuries, with shops, churches, a school and a dance hall as well as houses. The building on the corner of York and Pleasant Streets, founded in 1824 as a school, church and meeting-house, was acquired by the Museum of African American History in 1999. During the nineteenth century, Nantucket, which by this time was predominantly Quaker and supported the abolition of slavery, became part of the Underground Railroad, providing sanctuary to African Americans escaping slavery on the mainland. New Guinea was also home to Hawaiian Islanders who worked on the Nantucket whaleships, and to Wampanoags who had married into the African American community.

=== The Wampanoags ===
When English settlers arrived on Nantucket in 1659, the island was populated by Wampanoag Native Americans, one of the Indigenous peoples of the Northeastern Woodlands, who had been living there for thousands of years. As many as three thousand people lived on the island in groups governed by sachems. Within two years of their arrival, the settlers had persuaded two of the sachems, Wanackmamack and Nickanoose, to relinquish their rights to the island in exchange for 66 pounds sterling, equal to £10,805 today). In 1750 the deeds were upheld by a judge from the General Court of Massachusetts in spite of petitions from the Wampanoags claiming that the sachems had not had the authority to sell the land. The Wampanoags converted to Christianity and took up trades that were useful to the settlers, becoming, for example, carpenters and weavers. When the whaling industry developed on Nantucket in the 18th century, Wampanoag men went to sea and often made up half or more of the crew of the whaling ships. By the beginning of the 18th century, a system of debt bondage had been implemented to provide local colonists with steady access to a pool of Wampanoag labor.

During the century that followed the arrival of the settlers, the Wampanoag community did not thrive, and by 1763 they numbered only 358 people. Various factors contributed to this decline, including the destruction of the ecosystem that had sustained them, the disadvantages they faced in competing in the developing money economy, losses at sea, and the detrimental effect of rum on their health. In 1763 the Wampanoag community was struck down by an epidemic of unknown origin, which killed 222 of them while leaving local colonists unaffected. Some of the survivors left Nantucket and some married into the small African community on the island. Two children, Abram Quary and Dorcas Esop, who were born after the epidemic and lived until 1854 and 1855, have been acknowledged as Nantucket's last Native Americans. Wampanoags from Martha's Vineyard and Cape Cod have since then lived on Nantucket.

In 2021, the Nantucket Annual Town Meeting voted to replace the Columbus Day holiday with Indigenous People's Day.

=== Whaling industry ===
In his 1835 history of Nantucket Island, Obed Macy wrote that in the early pre-1672 colony, a whale of the kind called "scragg" entered the harbor and was pursued and killed by the settlers. This event started the Nantucket whaling industry. A. B. Van Deinse points out that the "scrag whale", described by P. Dudley in 1725 as one of the species hunted by early New England whalers, was almost certainly the gray whale, which has flourished on the west coast of North America in modern times with protection from whaling.

At the beginning of the 18th century, whaling on Nantucket was usually done from small boats launched from the island's shores, which would tow killed whales to be processed on the beach. These boats were only about seven meters long, with mostly Wampanoag manpower, sourced from a system of debt servitude established by local colonists—a typical boat's crew had five Wampanoag oarsmen and a single white man at the steering oar. Author Nathaniel Philbrick notes that "without the native population, which outnumbered the white population well into the 1720s, the island would never have become a successful whaling port."

Nantucket's dependence on trade with Britain, derived from its whaling and supporting industries, influenced its leading citizens to remain neutral during the American Revolutionary War, favoring neither the British nor the Patriots.

Herman Melville commented on Nantucket's whaling dominance in his novel Moby-Dick, Chapter 14: "Two thirds of this terraqueous globe are the Nantucketer's. For the sea is his; he owns it, as Emperors own empires". The Moby-Dick characters Ahab and Starbuck are both from Nantucket. The tragedy that inspired Melville to write Moby-Dick was the final voyage of the Nantucket whaler Essex.

The island suffered great economic hardships, worsened by the "Great Fire" of July 13, 1846, that, fueled by whale oil and lumber, devastated the main town, burning some 40 acres (16 hectares). The fire left hundreds homeless and poverty-stricken, and many people left the island.

By 1850, whaling was in decline, as Nantucket's whaling industry had been surpassed by that of New Bedford. Another contributor to the decline was the silting up of the harbor, which prevented large whaling ships from entering and leaving the port, unlike New Bedford, which still owned a deep water port. In addition, the development of railroads made mainland whaling ports, such as New Bedford, more attractive because of the ease of transshipment of whale oil onto trains, an advantage unavailable to an island. The onset of the California Gold Rush in 1849 further lured many of Nantucket's workers from whaling, as many islanders abandoned whaling in pursuit of opportunities in the West. The American Civil War dealt the death blow to the island's whaling industry, as virtually all of the remaining whaling vessels were destroyed by Confederate commerce raiders.

=== Later history ===
As a result of this depopulation, the island was left under-developed and isolated until the mid-20th century. Isolation from the mainland kept many of the pre-Civil War buildings intact and, by the 1950s, enterprising developers began buying up large sections of the island and restoring them to create an upmarket destination for wealthy people in the Northeastern United States.

Nantucket and towns on Martha's Vineyard contemplated seceding from the Commonwealth of Massachusetts, which they considered at various town meetings in 1977, unsuccessfully. The votes were sparked by a proposed change to the Massachusetts Constitution that would have reduced the size of the state's House of Representatives from 240 to 160 members and would therefore reduce the islands' representation in the Massachusetts General Court.

== Geology and geography ==
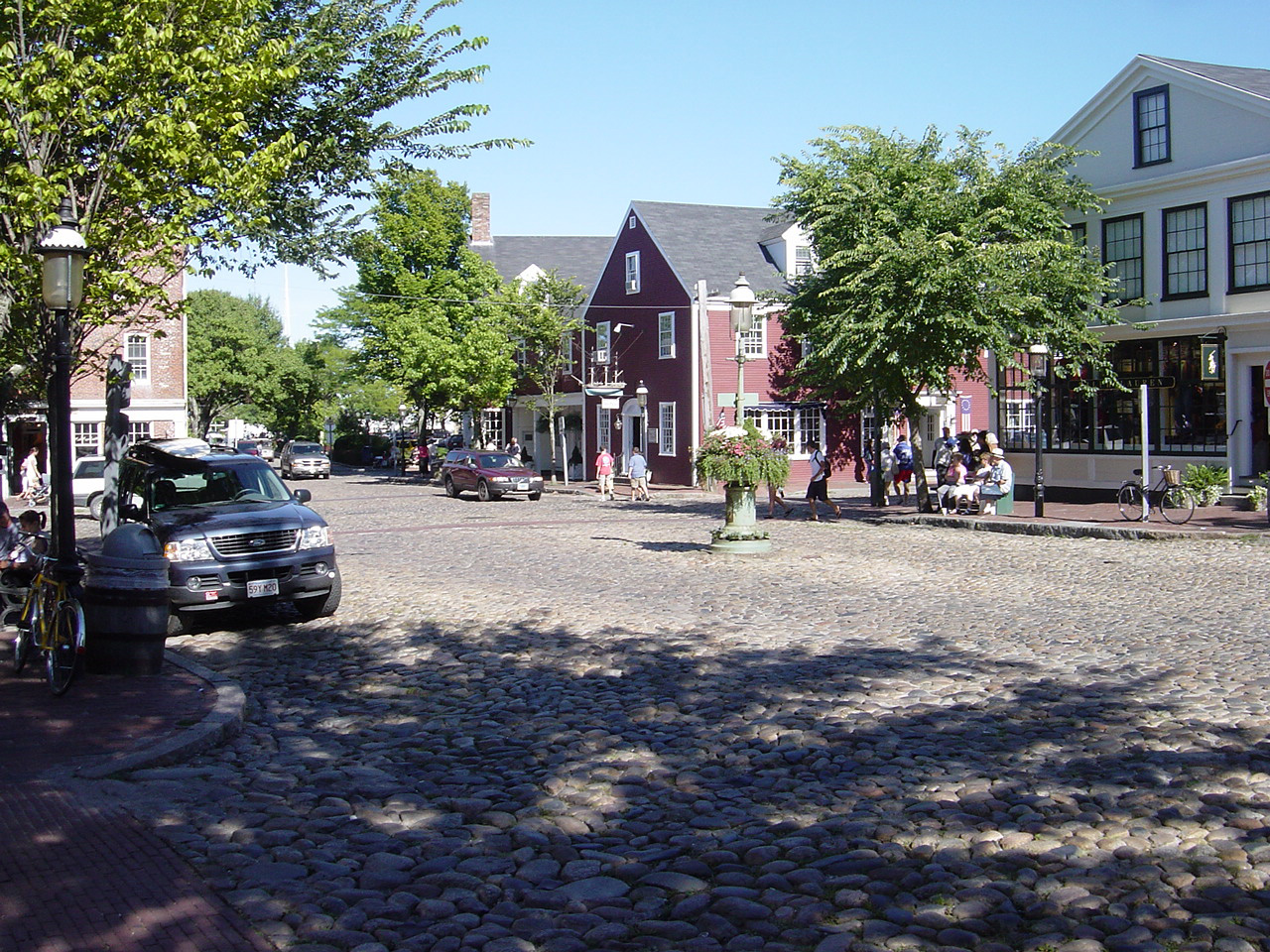
The cobblestone Main Street in historic downtown Nantucket

According to the U.S. Census Bureau, the county has a total area of 304 square miles (790 km^{2}), of which 45 square miles (120 km^{2}) is land and 259 square miles (670 km^{2}) (85%) is water. It is the smallest county in Massachusetts by land area and second-smallest by total area. The area of Nantucket Island proper is 47.8 square miles (124 km^{2}). The triangular region of ocean between Nantucket, Martha's Vineyard, and Cape Cod is Nantucket Sound. The highest points on the island include Saul's Hill at 102 feet (31 m), Altar Rock at 100 feet (30 m), and Sankaty Head at 92 feet (28 m).

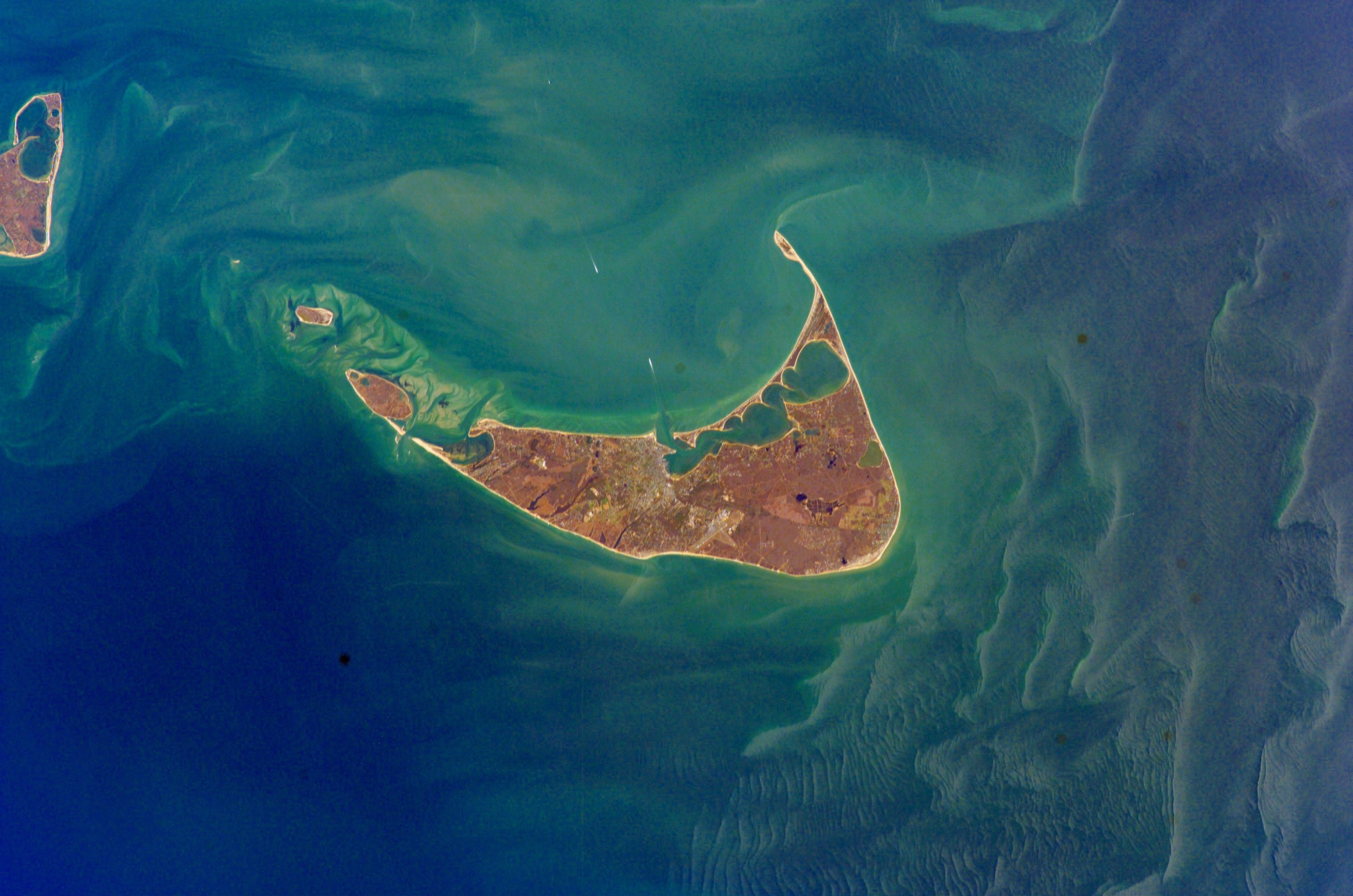
NASA satellite image of Nantucket Island

Nantucket was formed by the outermost reach of the Laurentide Ice Sheet during the recent Wisconsin Glaciation, shaped by the subsequent rise in sea level. The low ridge across the northern section of the island was deposited as glacial moraine during a period of glacial standstill, a period during which till continued to arrive and was deposited as the glacier melted at a stationary front. The southern part of the island is an outwash plain, sloping away from the arc of the moraine and shaped at its margins by the sorting actions and transport of longshore drift. Nantucket became an island when rising sea levels covered the connection with the mainland, about 5,000–6,000 years ago.

The island and adjoining islands of Tuckernuck and Muskeget comprise the Town and County of Nantucket, which is operated as a consolidated town and county government. The main settlement, also called Nantucket, is located at the western end of Nantucket Harbor, where it opens into Nantucket Sound. Key localities on the island include Madaket, Surfside, Polpis, Wauwinet, Miacomet, and Siasconset (generally shortened to "'Sconset").

== Climate ==
According to the Köppen climate classification system, Nantucket features a climate that is Cfb (oceanic), a climate type rarely found on the east coast of North America. Nantucket's climate is heavily influenced by the Atlantic Ocean, which helps moderate temperatures in the town throughout the course of the year. Average high temperatures during the town's coldest month (January) are around 40 °F (4 °C), while average high temperatures during the town's warmest months (July and August) hover around 75 °F (24 °C). Nantucket receives on average 41 inches (1,000 mm) of precipitation annually, spread relatively evenly throughout the year. Similar to many other cities with an oceanic climate, Nantucket features a large number of cloudy or overcast days, particularly outside the summer months. The highest daily maximum temperature was 100 °F (38 °C) on August 2, 1975, and the highest daily minimum temperature was 76 °F (24 °C) on the same day. The lowest daily maximum temperature was 12 °F (−11 °C) on January 8, 1968, and the lowest daily minimum temperature was −3 °F (−19 °C) on December 31, 1962, January 16, 2004, and February 4, 2023. The hardiness zone is 7b.

Climate data for Nantucket, Massachusetts (Nantucket Memorial Airport), 1991–2020 normals, extremes 1948–present
| Month | Jan | Feb | Mar | Apr | May | Jun | Jul | Aug | Sep | Oct | Nov | Dec | Year |
|---|---|---|---|---|---|---|---|---|---|---|---|---|---|
| Record high °F (°C) | 63 (17) | 61 (16) | 66 (19) | 83 (28) | 85 (29) | 92 (33) | 92 (33) | 100 (38) | 86 (30) | 83 (28) | 74 (23) | 63 (17) | 100 (38) |
| Mean maximum °F (°C) | 53.3 (11.8) | 50.8 (10.4) | 56.9 (13.8) | 66.4 (19.1) | 75.4 (24.1) | 81.2 (27.3) | 84.0 (28.9) | 83.4 (28.6) | 78.7 (25.9) | 72.8 (22.7) | 63.8 (17.7) | 57.9 (14.4) | 86.3 (30.2) |
| Mean daily maximum °F (°C) | 39.5 (4.2) | 40.1 (4.5) | 44.2 (6.8) | 52.2 (11.2) | 60.7 (15.9) | 68.7 (20.4) | 75.4 (24.1) | 75.7 (24.3) | 70.4 (21.3) | 61.9 (16.6) | 52.8 (11.6) | 45.1 (7.3) | 57.2 (14.0) |
| Daily mean °F (°C) | 33.1 (0.6) | 33.5 (0.8) | 37.9 (3.3) | 45.5 (7.5) | 53.8 (12.1) | 62.2 (16.8) | 69.0 (20.6) | 69.0 (20.6) | 63.7 (17.6) | 55.2 (12.9) | 46.4 (8.0) | 38.6 (3.7) | 50.7 (10.4) |
| Mean daily minimum °F (°C) | 26.6 (−3.0) | 27.0 (−2.8) | 31.5 (−0.3) | 38.8 (3.8) | 47.0 (8.3) | 55.7 (13.2) | 62.6 (17.0) | 62.4 (16.9) | 57.0 (13.9) | 48.6 (9.2) | 40.0 (4.4) | 32.2 (0.1) | 44.1 (6.7) |
| Mean minimum °F (°C) | 10.0 (−12.2) | 13.6 (−10.2) | 17.8 (−7.9) | 28.7 (−1.8) | 35.8 (2.1) | 46.6 (8.1) | 54.2 (12.3) | 52.5 (11.4) | 44.6 (7.0) | 34.8 (1.6) | 26.5 (−3.1) | 17.9 (−7.8) | 8.3 (−13.2) |
| Record low °F (°C) | −3 (−19) | −3 (−19) | 7 (−14) | 20 (−7) | 28 (−2) | 35 (2) | 47 (8) | 39 (4) | 34 (1) | 22 (−6) | 16 (−9) | −3 (−19) | −3 (−19) |
| Average precipitation inches (mm) | 3.18 (81) | 2.84 (72) | 3.84 (98) | 3.60 (91) | 2.98 (76) | 3.00 (76) | 2.72 (69) | 3.00 (76) | 3.59 (91) | 4.39 (112) | 3.79 (96) | 3.93 (100) | 40.86 (1,038) |
| Average snowfall inches (cm) | 8.1 (21) | 9.6 (24) | 6.9 (18) | 0.9 (2.3) | 0.0 (0.0) | 0.0 (0.0) | 0.0 (0.0) | 0.0 (0.0) | 0.0 (0.0) | 0.0 (0.0) | 0.3 (0.76) | 6.5 (17) | 32.3 (83.06) |
| Average extreme snow depth inches (cm) | 4.0 (10) | 4.6 (12) | 3.1 (7.9) | 0.2 (0.51) | 0.0 (0.0) | 0.0 (0.0) | 0.0 (0.0) | 0.0 (0.0) | 0.0 (0.0) | 0.0 (0.0) | 0.1 (0.25) | 3.1 (7.9) | 7.6 (19) |
| Average precipitation days (≥ 0.01 in) | 11.6 | 10.2 | 10.5 | 11.9 | 11.7 | 11.6 | 11.9 | 13.1 | 12.5 | 13.1 | 10.9 | 12.4 | 141.4 |
| Average snowy days (≥ 0.1 in) | 4.8 | 5.0 | 3.7 | 0.7 | 0.0 | 0.0 | 0.0 | 0.0 | 0.0 | 0.0 | 0.3 | 3.9 | 18.4 |
Source: NOAA (snow/snow days/snow depth 1948–1973)

In 2021, a 270-page coastal resilience plan was drafted to deal with issues related to climate change: groundwater table rise, coastal flooding, high tide flooding, and coastal erosion. The plan identified forty proposed projects over the next fifteen years at a cost of $930 million. The coastal resilience advisory coordinator anticipated damages through 2070 of $3.4 billion if nothing is done to fight sea level rise.

== Demographics ==
Historical population
| Census | Pop. | Note | %± |
|---|---|---|---|
| 1790 | 4,555 | | — |
| 1800 | 5,617 | | 23.3% |
| 1810 | 6,807 | | 21.2% |
| 1820 | 7,266 | | 6.7% |
| 1830 | 7,202 | | −0.9% |
| 1840 | 9,012 | | 25.1% |
| 1850 | 8,452 | | −6.2% |
| 1860 | 6,094 | | −27.9% |
| 1870 | 4,123 | | −32.3% |
| 1880 | 3,727 | | −9.6% |
| 1890 | 3,268 | | −12.3% |
| 1900 | 3,006 | | −8.0% |
| 1910 | 2,962 | | −1.5% |
| 1920 | 2,797 | | −5.6% |
| 1930 | 3,678 | | 31.5% |
| 1940 | 3,401 | | −7.5% |
| 1950 | 3,484 | | 2.4% |
| 1960 | 3,559 | | 2.2% |
| 1970 | 3,774 | | 6.0% |
| 1980 | 5,087 | | 34.8% |
| 1990 | 6,012 | | 18.2% |
| 2000 | 9,520 | | 58.3% |
| 2010 | 10,172 | | 6.8% |
| 2020 | 14,255 | | 40.1% |
| 2025 (est.) | 14,758 | ▲ | 3.5% |
U.S. Decennial Census; 1790–1960 1900–1990; 1990–2000 2010–2020

As of the 2020 United States census, there were 14,255 people, up from 10,172 in 2010, residing in the county.

=== Racial and ethnic composition ===
Nantucket County, Massachusetts – Racial and ethnic composition Note: the US Census treats Hispanic/Latino as an ethnic category. This table excludes Latinos from the racial categories and assigns them to a separate category. Hispanics/Latinos may be of any race.
| Race / Ethnicity (NH = Non-Hispanic) | Pop 1980 | Pop 1990 | Pop 2000 | Pop 2010 | Pop 2020 | % 1980 | % 1990 | % 2000 | % 2010 | % 2020 |
|---|---|---|---|---|---|---|---|---|---|---|
| White alone (NH) | 4,884 | 5,759 | 8,275 | 8,192 | 9,889 | 96.01% | 95.79% | 86.92% | 80.53% | 69.37% |
| Black or African American alone (NH) | 106 | 140 | 783 | 664 | 1,006 | 2.08% | 2.33% | 8.22% | 6.53% | 7.06% |
| Native American or Alaska Native alone (NH) | 3 | 5 | 1 | 6 | 19 | 0.06% | 0.08% | 0.01% | 0.06% | 0.13% |
| Asian alone (NH) | 10 | 18 | 60 | 118 | 263 | 0.20% | 0.30% | 0.63% | 1.16% | 1.84% |
| Native Hawaiian or Pacific Islander alone (NH) | x | x | 4 | 1 | 2 | x | x | 0.04% | 0.01% | 0.01% |
| Other race alone (NH) | 52 | 40 | 54 | 79 | 149 | 1.02% | 0.67% | 0.57% | 0.78% | 1.05% |
| Mixed race or Multiracial (NH) | x | x | 131 | 155 | 615 | x | x | 1.38% | 1.52% | 4.31% |
| Hispanic or Latino (any race) | 32 | 50 | 212 | 957 | 2,312 | 0.63% | 0.83% | 2.23% | 9.41% | 16.22% |
| Total | 5,087 | 6,012 | 9,520 | 10,172 | 14,255 | 100.00% | 100.00% | 100.00% | 100.00% | 100.00% |

The 2020 data for racial makeup of the county was 71.3% white, 7.2% black or African American, 1.9% Asian, 0.6% American Indian, 9.3% from other races, and 9.7% from two or more races. Those of Hispanic or Latino origin made up 16.2% of the population. The median age of the population was 39.9 years; 22.2% were aged under 21 years, while 15.9% were aged over 65 years.

According to the 2020 census data for Nantucket County, the largest groups by origins (alone or in any combination) were Irish Americans (2,612), English (2,492), German (1,229), Italian (901), Jamaican (635), Scottish (632), French (476), Polish (389), Portuguese (285), African Americans (251), Swedish (247) and Bulgarian (201). By Hispanic origins of any race, Salvadoran (1,143), Dominican (501), Mexican (124), Guatemalan (63), Spanish (46), Puerto Rican (41), Spaniard (34) and Colombian (32).

=== Housing ===
There were 12,619 housing units on the island; 5,478 were occupied with most of the rest being for seasonal, recreational or occasional use. 59.7% of the occupied housing units were owner-occupied, 40.3% were renter-occupied. Of the 5,478 households, 52.1% contained married or cohabiting couples. In 19.7% of households a couple were living with their children aged under 18, while a further 6% of households contained a householder living alone with their children under 18.

In 2017–2021, the median income for a household in the county was $116,571 and the per capita income was $52,324. 5.9% of the population were living below the poverty line.

As of the fourth quarter of 2021, the median value of homes in Nantucket County was $1,370,522, an increase of 22.3% from the prior year, and ranked the highest in the US by median home value.

== Government ==
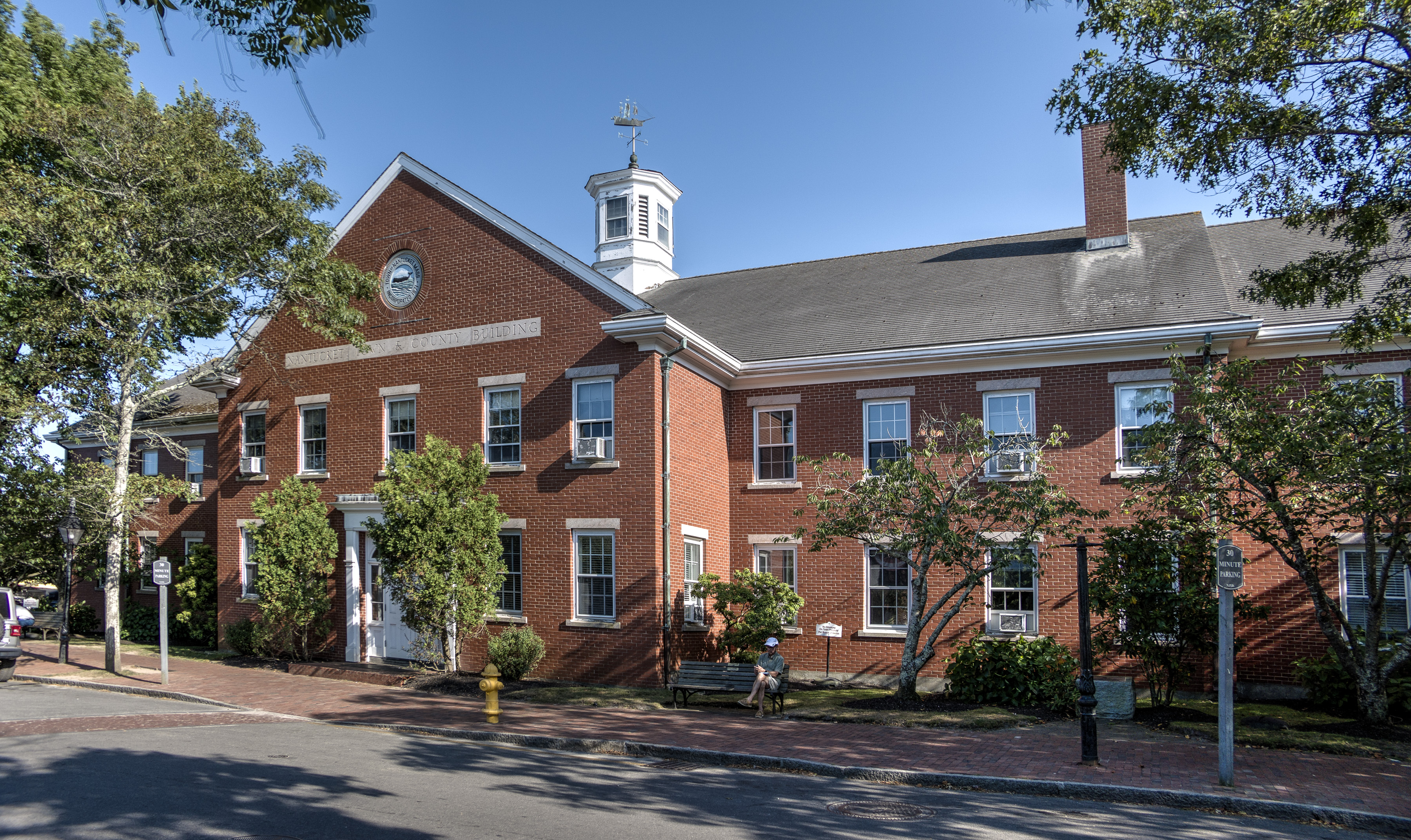
Nantucket Town & County Building

Nantucket is the only such consolidated town-county in Massachusetts. As of the 2020 census, the population was 14,255, making it the least populated county in Massachusetts. Part of the town is designated the Nantucket CDP, or census-designated place. The region of Surfside on Nantucket is the southernmost settlement in Massachusetts.

=== Local ===
Town and county governments are combined in Nantucket (see List of counties in Massachusetts). Nantucket's elected executive body is its Select Board (name changed in 2018 from Board of Selectmen), which is responsible for the town government's goals and policies. Legislative functions are carried out by an open Town Meeting of the Town's registered voters. It is administered by a town manager, who is responsible for all departments, except for the school, airport and water departments.

=== State ===
Nantucket is represented in the Massachusetts House of Representatives by Dylan Fernandes, Democrat, of Woods Hole, who represents Precincts 1, 2, 5 and 6, of Falmouth, in Barnstable County; Chilmark, Edgartown, Aquinnah, Gosnold, Oak Bluffs, Tisbury and West Tisbury, all in Dukes County; and Nantucket. Rep. Fernandes has served since January 4, 2017. Nantucket is represented in the Massachusetts Senate by Julian Cyr, Democrat, of Truro, who has also served since January 4, 2017.

=== National ===
Nantucket was in Massachusetts's 10th congressional district until that district was eliminated by redistricting after the 2010 census; since 2013 it has been part of Massachusetts's 9th congressional district, represented by Democrat Bill Keating. Massachusetts is currently represented in the United States Senate by senior senator Elizabeth Warren (Democrat) and junior senator Ed Markey (Democrat).

== Politics ==
=== Party affiliations ===
In 2024, 63% of Nantucket residents were unaligned with a major political party, 25% were registered Democrats, and 10% were registered Republicans.

Voter registration and party enrollment as of February 2024
| Unenrolled* | 6,212 | 63.39% |
| Democratic | 2,486 | 25.37% |
| Republican | 993 | 10.13% |
| Libertarian | 36 | 0.37% |
| Other parties | 73 | 0.74% |
| Total | 9,800 | 100% |

^{*}The Commonwealth of Massachusetts allows voters to enroll with a political party or to remain "unenrolled".

=== Voting patterns ===
Throughout the late 19th and most of the 20th century, Nantucket was a Republican stronghold in presidential elections. From 1876 to 1984, only two Democrats carried Nantucket: Woodrow Wilson and Lyndon Johnson. Since 1988, however, it has trended Democratic.

United States presidential election results for Nantucket County, Massachusetts
| Year | Republican | | Democratic | | Third party(ies) | |
| Year | No. | % | No. | % | No. | % |
|---|---|---|---|---|---|---|
| 1868 | 471 | 91.10% | 46 | 8.90% | 0 | 0.00% |
| 1872 | 316 | 93.49% | 22 | 6.51% | 0 | 0.00% |
| 1876 | 379 | 78.63% | 103 | 21.37% | 0 | 0.00% |
| 1880 | 395 | 78.53% | 108 | 21.47% | 0 | 0.00% |
| 1884 | 328 | 59.53% | 204 | 37.02% | 19 | 3.45% |
| 1888 | 487 | 68.11% | 215 | 30.07% | 13 | 1.82% |
| 1892 | 440 | 65.48% | 220 | 32.74% | 12 | 1.79% |
| 1896 | 485 | 79.25% | 62 | 10.13% | 65 | 10.62% |
| 1900 | 375 | 76.69% | 102 | 20.86% | 12 | 2.45% |
| 1904 | 378 | 67.26% | 170 | 30.25% | 14 | 2.49% |
| 1908 | 359 | 70.81% | 136 | 26.82% | 12 | 2.37% |
| 1912 | 123 | 21.81% | 247 | 43.79% | 194 | 34.40% |
| 1916 | 249 | 44.15% | 307 | 54.43% | 8 | 1.42% |
| 1920 | 608 | 74.51% | 205 | 25.12% | 3 | 0.37% |
| 1924 | 708 | 79.64% | 167 | 18.79% | 14 | 1.57% |
| 1928 | 865 | 68.60% | 395 | 31.32% | 1 | 0.08% |
| 1932 | 812 | 58.84% | 561 | 40.65% | 7 | 0.51% |
| 1936 | 969 | 62.76% | 548 | 35.49% | 27 | 1.75% |
| 1940 | 1,015 | 61.63% | 624 | 37.89% | 8 | 0.49% |
| 1944 | 779 | 57.75% | 569 | 42.18% | 1 | 0.07% |
| 1948 | 1,013 | 70.25% | 409 | 28.36% | 20 | 1.39% |
| 1952 | 1,490 | 78.55% | 405 | 21.35% | 2 | 0.11% |
| 1956 | 1,582 | 83.26% | 317 | 16.68% | 1 | 0.05% |
| 1960 | 1,219 | 63.52% | 698 | 36.37% | 2 | 0.10% |
| 1964 | 587 | 32.85% | 1,197 | 66.98% | 3 | 0.17% |
| 1968 | 991 | 55.30% | 744 | 41.52% | 57 | 3.18% |
| 1972 | 1,418 | 59.58% | 952 | 40.00% | 10 | 0.42% |
| 1976 | 1,399 | 53.27% | 1,115 | 42.46% | 112 | 4.27% |
| 1980 | 1,149 | 40.49% | 1,040 | 36.65% | 649 | 22.87% |
| 1984 | 1,697 | 53.53% | 1,456 | 45.93% | 17 | 0.54% |
| 1988 | 1,469 | 39.37% | 2,209 | 59.21% | 53 | 1.42% |
| 1992 | 1,158 | 27.47% | 2,037 | 48.32% | 1,021 | 24.22% |
| 1996 | 1,222 | 29.38% | 2,453 | 58.98% | 484 | 11.64% |
| 2000 | 1,624 | 32.97% | 2,874 | 58.34% | 428 | 8.69% |
| 2004 | 2,040 | 35.64% | 3,608 | 63.03% | 76 | 1.33% |
| 2008 | 1,863 | 30.78% | 4,073 | 67.30% | 116 | 1.92% |
| 2012 | 2,187 | 35.74% | 3,830 | 62.58% | 103 | 1.68% |
| 2016 | 1,892 | 29.07% | 4,146 | 63.71% | 470 | 7.22% |
| 2020 | 1,914 | 26.20% | 5,241 | 71.74% | 151 | 2.07% |
| 2024 | 2,171 | 30.50% | 4,784 | 67.21% | 163 | 2.29% |

== Economy ==
=== Top employers ===
According to Nantucket's 2018 Comprehensive Annual Financial Report, the top employers in the town are:

| # | Employer | # of employees |
|---|---|---|
| 1 | Town of Nantucket | 670 |
| 2 | Nantucket Cottage Hospital | 180 |
| 3 | Nantucket Island Resorts | 125 |
| 4 | Marine Home Center | 90 |
| 5 | Stop & Shop | 90 |
| 6 | Rockland Trust | 60 |
| 7 | Myles Reis Trucking | 30 |
| 8 | The Woods Hole, Martha's Vineyard and Nantucket Steamship Authority | 28 |
| 9 | Don Allen | 25 |
| 10 | Bartlett Oceanview Farm | 25 |

== Education ==
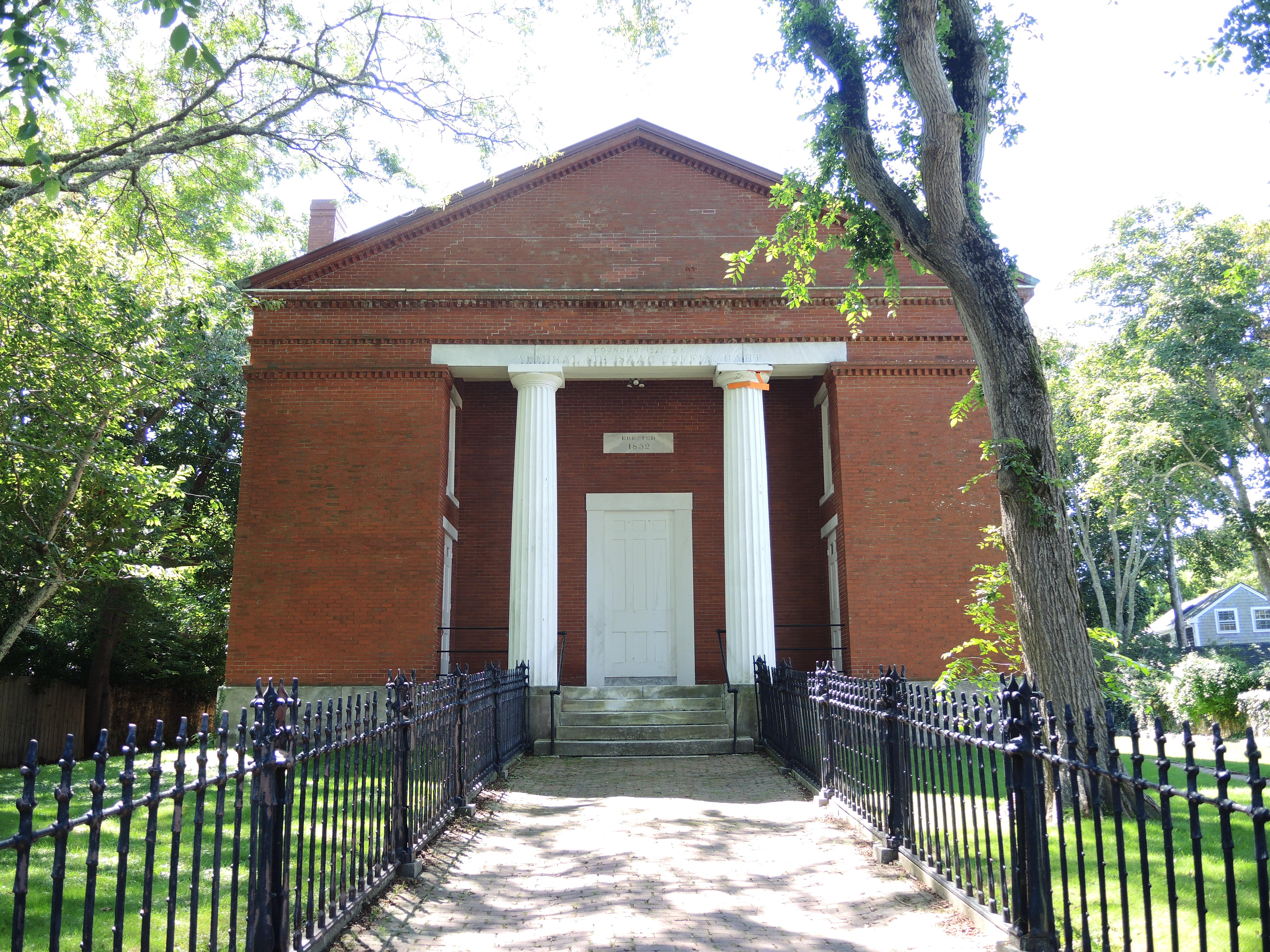
In 1827, Admiral Sir Isaac Coffin set up the Coffin School to educate descendants of Tristram Coffin. After initially faltering, the school was reconstituted in this building on Winter Street in 1854.

Nantucket's public school district is Nantucket Public Schools. The Nantucket school system had 1,583 students and 137 teachers in 2017.

Public schools on the island include:

- Nantucket Elementary School (Pre-K–2)
- Nantucket Intermediate School (3–5)
- Cyrus Peirce Middle School (6–8)
- Nantucket High School (9–12)
- Nantucket Community School (extracurricular)

Private schools on the island include:

- Montessori Children's House of Nantucket (Pre-K–K)
- Nantucket Lighthouse School (Preschool–5)
- Nantucket New School (Preschool–8)

Nantucket Public Schools District information and meetings are broadcast on Nantucket Community Television (Channel 18) in Nantucket.

A major museum association, the Maria Mitchell Association, offers educational programs to the Nantucket Public Schools, as well as the Nantucket Historical Association, though the two are not affiliated.

The University of Massachusetts Boston operates a field station on Nantucket. The Massachusetts College of Art & Design is affiliated with the Nantucket Island School of Design & the Arts, which offers summer courses for teens, youth, postgraduate, and undergraduate programs.

== Arts and culture ==
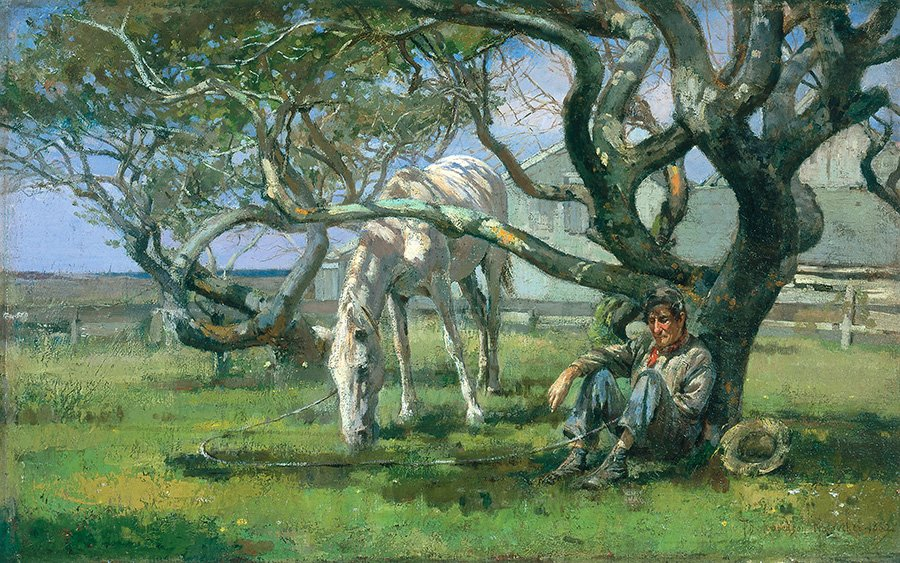
Theodore Robinson's painting Nantucket, 1882

Nantucket has several noted museums and galleries, including the Maria Mitchell Association and the Nantucket Whaling Museum.

Nantucket is home to both visual and performing arts. The island has been an art colony since the 1920s, whose artists have come to capture the natural beauty of the island's landscapes and seascapes, including its flora and the fauna. Noted artists who have lived on or painted in Nantucket include Frank Swift Chase and Theodore Robinson. Illustrator and puppeteer Tony Sarg moved to the island in 1922, and in 1937 created an inflatable creature which sailed across the harbour as part of the "sea monster" hoax. Artist Rodney Charman was commissioned to create a series of paintings depicting the marine history of Nantucket, which were collected in the book Portrait of Nantucket, 1659–1890: The Paintings of Rodney Charman in 1989.

The island is the site of a number of festivals, including a book festival, wine and food festival, comedy festival, daffodil festival, and a cranberry festival.

=== Popular culture ===
Several historical, literary and dramatic works involve people from, or living on, Nantucket. These include:

- Herman Melville's classic novel Moby-Dick is based on the Nantucket whaling industry, with narrator Ishmael starting his voyage from Nantucket.
- Nathaniel Philbrick's Away Off Shore: Nantucket Island and Its People, 1602–1890.
- Nathaniel Philbrick's In the Heart of the Sea: The Tragedy of the Whaleship Essex.
- Edgar Allan Poe's The Narrative of Arthur Gordon Pym of Nantucket chronicles the story of young Nantucket-born adventurer Arthur Gordon Pym.
- The science-fiction-based Nantucket series by S. M. Stirling has the island being sent back in time from March 17, 1998, to circa 1250 BC in the Bronze Age.
- Most of the Joan Aiken novel Nightbirds on Nantucket is set on the island.
- Hilbert Schenck's science fiction short story The Morphology of the Kirkham Wreck, based on real events, is set on Nantucket and in the dangerous waters offshore.
- The 1971 coming-of-age film Summer of '42 was set in Nantucket.
- The 1986 comedy One Crazy Summer was set in Nantucket and filmed on Cape Cod.
- The 1990s sitcom Wings, which aired eight seasons from 1990 to 1997, was set in Nantucket. The series took place at the fictional "Tom Nevers Field" airport and other locations. It was filmed in LA but all of the establishing shots were filmed at various sites on the island and included fictional versions of real establishments, such as The Club Car restaurant.
- The 2007 comedy The Nanny Diaries has the climax of the film take place at Mr X's Mother's Nantucket oversized Cape-Cod-styled home. Filmed in the Hamptons but made to look like Nantucket.
- The island's name is used as a rhyming device in a noted limerick, beginning "There once was a man from Nantucket..".
- Elin Hilderbrand's novels are set on Nantucket.
- Nantucket is the setting for the Merry Folger series of mystery novels by Francine Mathews.
- Nantucket is the setting for Josephine Angelini's Starcrossed series.
- American journalist Pam Belluck's 2012 non-fiction book Island Practice follows the misadventures of Nantucket doctor Timothy J. Lepore, MD.
- The 2011 documentary Nantucket, directed by Ric Burns for the Nantucket Historical Association, presents the island's history from its Wampanoag origins and early Quaker community through its prominence as a whaling center and later development as a resort.
- Andrew Hussie's 2021 visual novel Psycholonials takes place in 2020 on Nantucket.
- In the Quentin Tarantino film, Inglourious Basterds, Colonel Hans Landa of the German Sicherheitsdienst negotiates a deal where he is awarded a property on Nantucket Island.
- A Japanese manga series by Hidekaz Himaruya, Chibisan Date, is set on Nantucket during the 1960s. In Himaruya's other manga, Hetalia: Axis Powers, America, the anthropomorphic personification of the United States, has an ahoge that represents Nantucket.
- The Lin Coffin Murder Mystery series of 24 books written by J. A. Whiting is set in Nantucket; in the books Lin can see ghosts of people that had lived in Nantucket in the 1800s. She settles their spirits so that they can move on.

== Transportation ==
=== Water ===
Ferry service is provided year-round by the Steamship Authority and Hy-Line Cruises. Seasonal ferry services include ferries from New Bedford, Harwich, and Oak Bluffs on Martha's Vineyard. Private boats can also access the island via Nantucket Harbor.

=== Air ===
The island is served by Nantucket Memorial Airport (IATA: ACK), located on the south side of the island. During the summer months, the airport becomes one of the busiest in Massachusetts, handling a high volume of private aircraft and seasonal commercial flights. Carriers such as Cape Air operate frequent regional flights, primarily using small aircraft such as the Cessna 402 and Tecnam P2012 Traveler. JetBlue, American Eagle, Delta Connection, and United Express also offer seasonal jet service to major hubs, including Boston, New York, Washington, D.C., and Chicago.

=== Bus ===
The Nantucket Regional Transit Authority operates year-round bus service on the island.

=== Bike ===
The island also supports an extensive network of bike paths, and bicycling is a popular way to explore Nantucket.

=== Car ===
Taxis, rental cars, and ride-sharing services are available, though limited in number.

=== Historic ===
From 1900 to 1918, Nantucket was one of few jurisdictions in the United States that banned automobiles.

A narrow-gauge railway, the Nantucket Railroad, operated from 1881 to 1917, connecting Nantucket town to Surfside and later to Siasconset. It served both passengers and freight but was eventually shut down due to financial difficulties and the rise of alternative transportation.

During the early 20th century, steamboats were the primary means of reaching the island. These vessels connected Nantucket to the mainland before the rise of modern ferry systems and air travel.

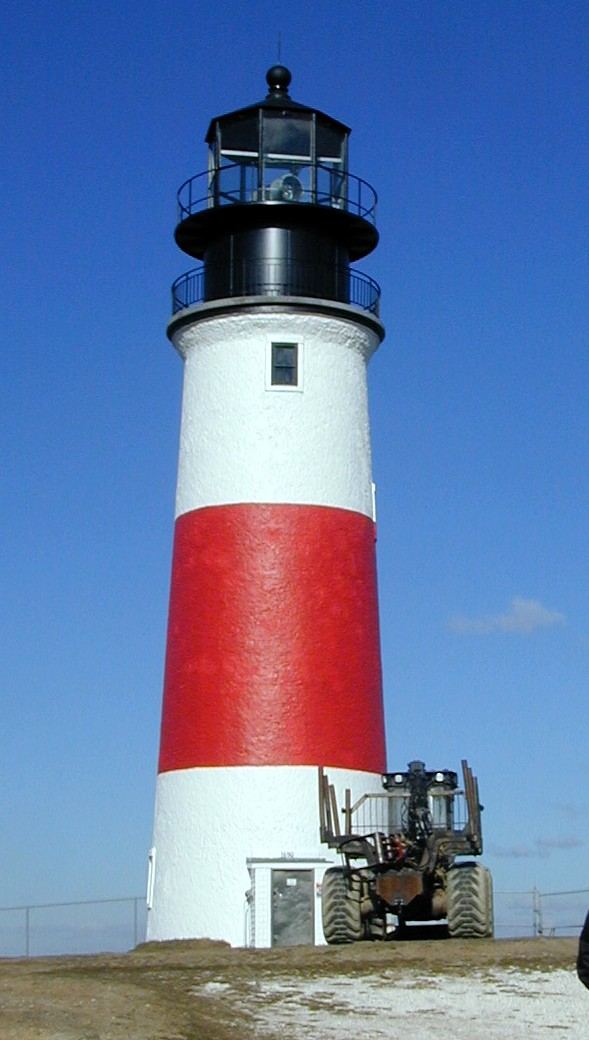
Sankaty Head Light lighthouse

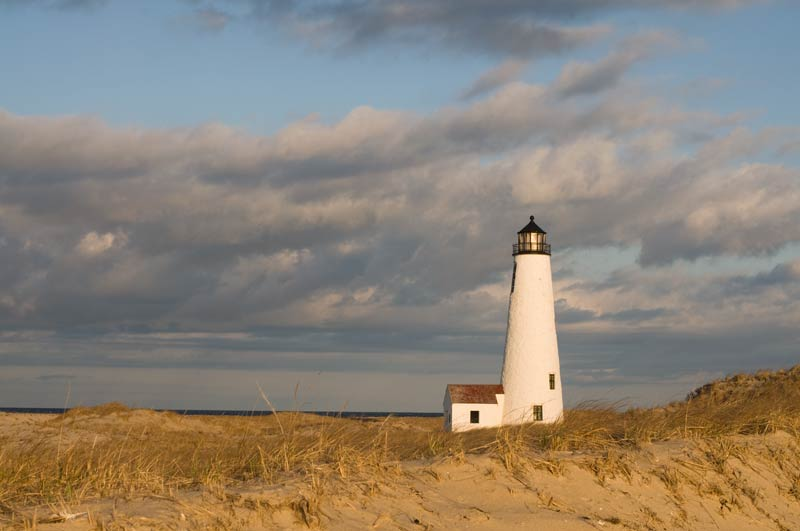
Great Point Lighthouse

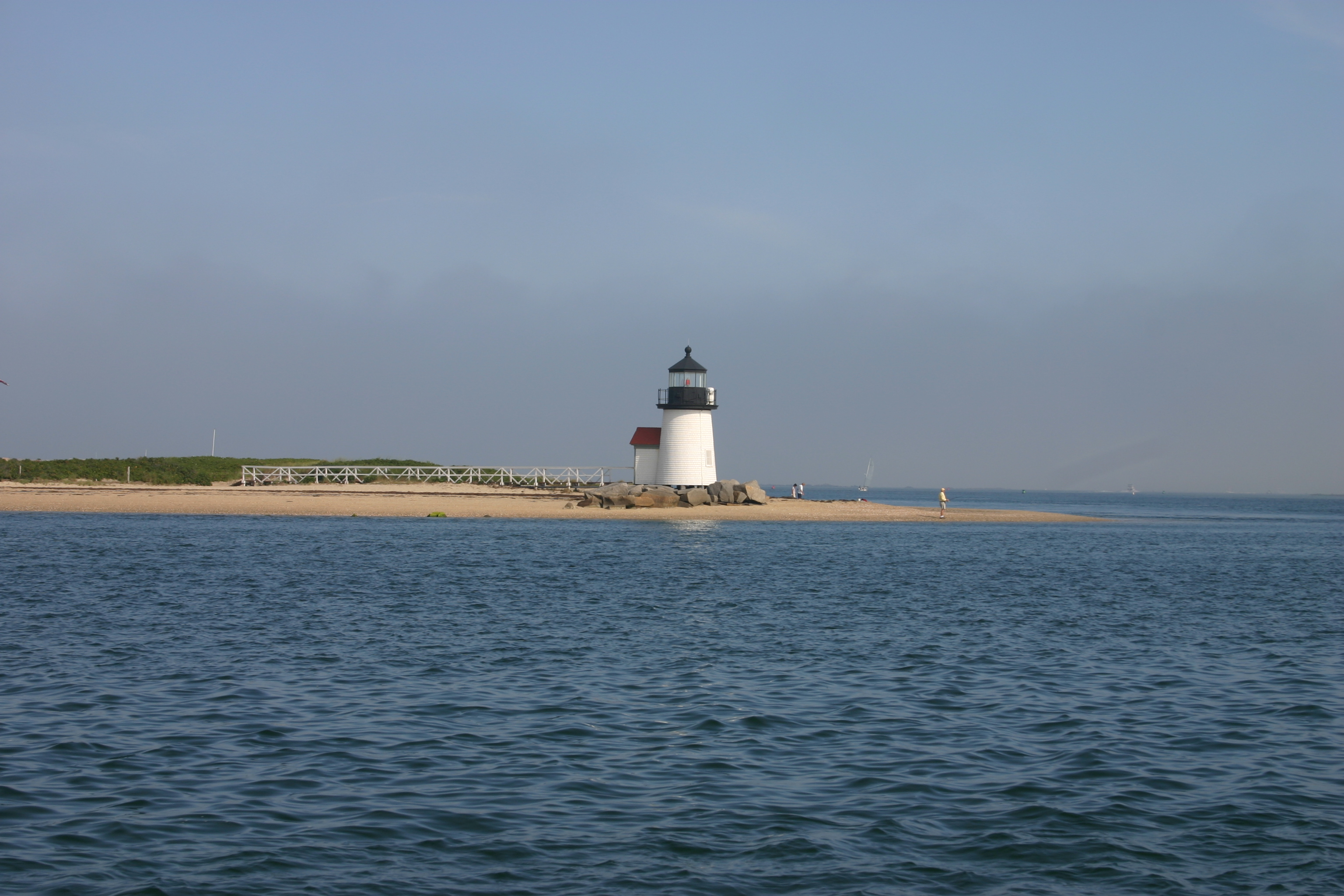
Brant Point Light in Nantucket Harbor

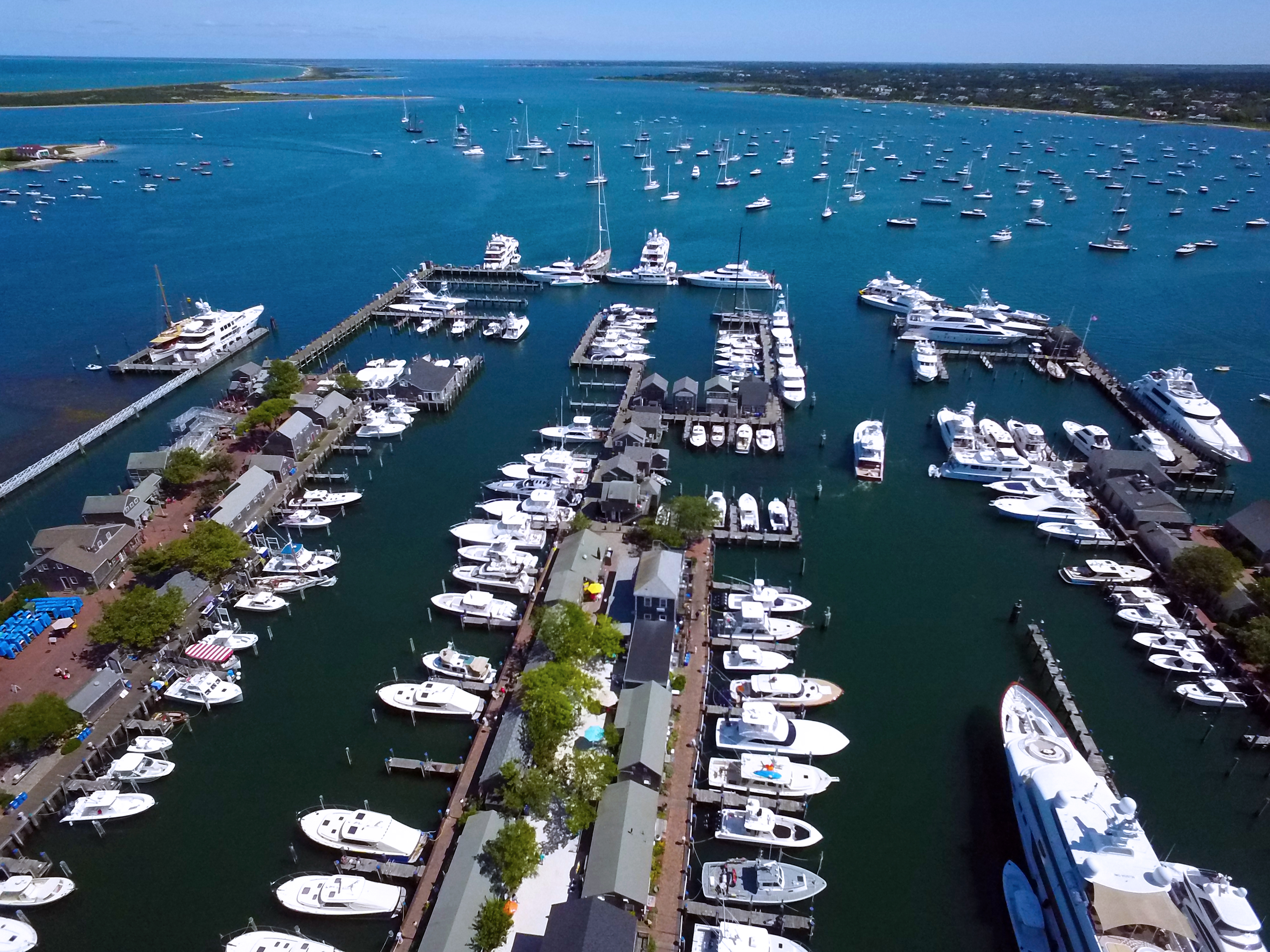
Nantucket Boat Basin

=== Transportation disasters ===
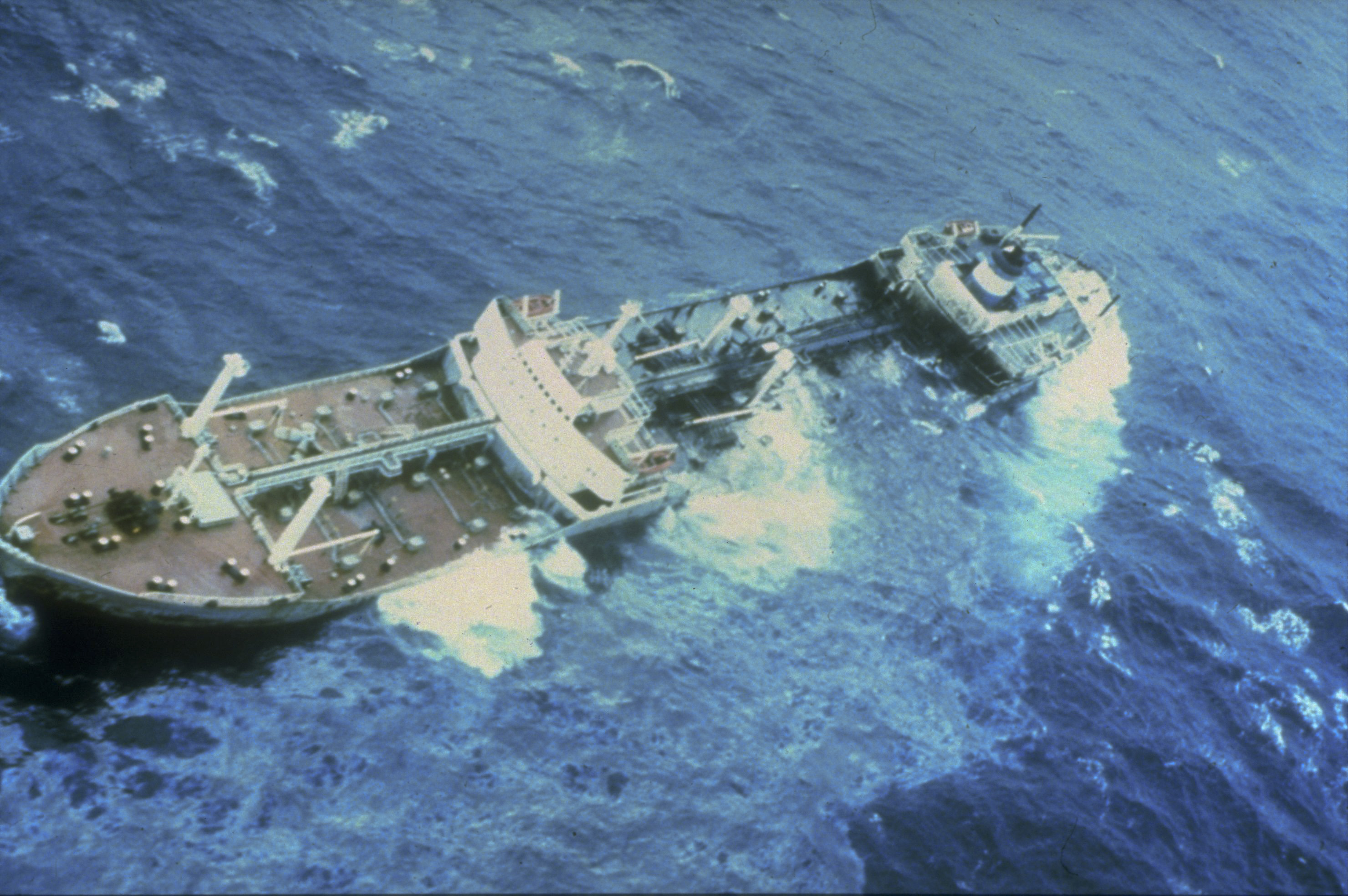
The Argo Merchant ran aground on December 15, 1976. A silvery oil slick can be seen coming from the center holds in the foreground.

Nantucket waters were the site of several noted transportation disasters:

- On May 15, 1934, the ocean liner RMS Olympic, sister ship to RMS Titanic, rammed and sank the Nantucket Lightship LV-117 in heavy fog, roughly 45 miles south of Nantucket Island. Four men survived out of a crew of 11.
- On July 25, 1956, the Italian ocean liner SS Andrea Doria collided with the MS Stockholm in heavy fog 45 miles (72 km) south of Nantucket, resulting in the deaths of 51 people (46 on the Andrea Doria, 5 on the Stockholm).
- On August 15, 1958, Northeast Airlines Flight 258 crashed on approach to Nantucket Memorial Airport, killing 25 of the 34 passengers and crew.
- On December 15, 1976, the oil tanker Argo Merchant ran aground 29 miles (47 km) southeast of Nantucket. Six days later, on December 21, the wrecked ship broke apart, causing a large oil spill.
- On October 31, 1999, EgyptAir Flight 990, traveling from New York City to Cairo, crashed approximately 60 miles (97 km) south of Nantucket, killing all 217 people on board.

== National Register of Historic Places ==
The following Nantucket places are listed on the National Register of Historic Places:

- Nantucket Historic District, a National Historic Landmark District (added December 13, 1966); Expanded to encompass the entire island in 1975.
- Brant Point Light Station—Brant Point (added October 28, 1987)
- Jethro Coffin House—a National Historic Landmark, Sunset Hill Road (added December 24, 1968)
- Sankaty Head Light (added November 15, 1987)

== Notable people ==
While many notable people own property or regularly visit the island, the following have been residents of the island:

- Askamaboo, a 17th-century female Wampanoag sachem
- William Barnes Sr., attorney and Republican Party political leader
- Eliza Starbuck Barney, abolitionist, genealogist
- Caio Canedo, Emirati national team soccer player
- Donick Cary writer, producer
- James H. Cromartie, artist
- A. J. Cronin, novelist
- Doug DeMuro, Entrepreneur, founder of automotive auction website Cars & Bids, automotive journalist, automotive content creator
- James A. Folger, founder of the coffee company bearing his name
- Mayhew Folger, whaling captain
- Peter Folger, missionary
- Anna Gardner, abolitionist, poet, teacher
- Robert Moller Gilbreth, businessman, educator, and politician
- Phebe Ann Coffin Hanaford, first woman ordained as a Universalist minister in New England
- Elin Hilderbrand, author
- Dorcas Honorable, last of the Nantucket Wampanoags
- Pauline Mackay, golfer
- Rowland Hussey Macy, 19th-century retailer, founder of Macy's department store
- Maria Mitchell, astronomer
- Allison Mleczko, ice hockey player
- Raymond Rocco Monto, orthopedic surgeon
- Mary Morrill, grandmother of Benjamin Franklin
- Lucretia Coffin Mott, minister, abolitionist, social reformer, and proponent of women's rights
- Cyrus Peirce, educator
- Nathaniel Philbrick, author
- Dorothy Priesing, composer
- Joseph Gardner Swift, first graduate of the United States Military Academy
- Nancy Thayer, author
- Meghan Trainor, singer and songwriter
- Charles F. Winslow, physician, 19th-century science author
- Mary A. Brayton Woodbridge, 19th-century temperance reformer, editor

== Sister cities ==
- Beaune, Côte d'Or, France

== See also ==
History

- Essex tragedy
- Nantucket during the American Revolutionary War era
- Nantucket shipbuilding

Culture

- Maria Mitchell Association
- Nantucket Dreamland Foundation
- Nantucket Reds
- Nantucket Historical Association
- The Nantucket Project
- 'Man from Nantucket' limerick

Other

- Nantucket Forests
- List of Massachusetts locations by per capita income
- List of National Historic Landmarks in Massachusetts
- National Register of Historic Places listings in Nantucket County, Massachusetts

== General and cited references ==
- Bond, C. Lawrence, Native Names of New England Towns and Villages, privately published by C. Lawrence Bond, Topsfield, Massachusetts, 1991.
- I Once Had a Chum from Nantucket by Drs. Ernest and Convalescence Bidet-Wellville on Neatorama
- Fabrikant, Geraldine, "Old Nantucket Warily Meets the New", New York Times, June 5, 2005
- 36 Hours in Nantucket in the New York Times of July 18, 2010
