= Timeline of Nantucket =

The following is a timeline of the history of Nantucket, Massachusetts, United States.

== 17th century ==
- 1621 – Island granted to Plymouth Company of London.
- 1641 – Island bought by Thomas Mayhew.
- 1659
  - Island sold to Thomas Barnard, Peter Coffin, Tristram Coffin, Christopher Hussey, Thomas Macy, William Pike, John Swayne, and Richard Swayne.
  - Proprietors of the Common and Undivided Land established.
- 1660 – Island becomes part of the Province of New York.
- 1661 – Settlers arrive from Amesbury and Salisbury, Massachusetts.
- 1665 – Maddequet Ditch (canal) dug.
- 1671 – Town incorporated.
- 1672 – Town relocated to Wescoe from Madaket.
- 1673 – Town named "Sherburne."
- 1683 – Island becomes part of Dukes County, Province of New York.
- 1686 – Jethro Coffin house built.
- 1692 – Island becomes part of the Province of Massachusetts Bay.
- 1695 – Nantucket County established.

== 18th century ==
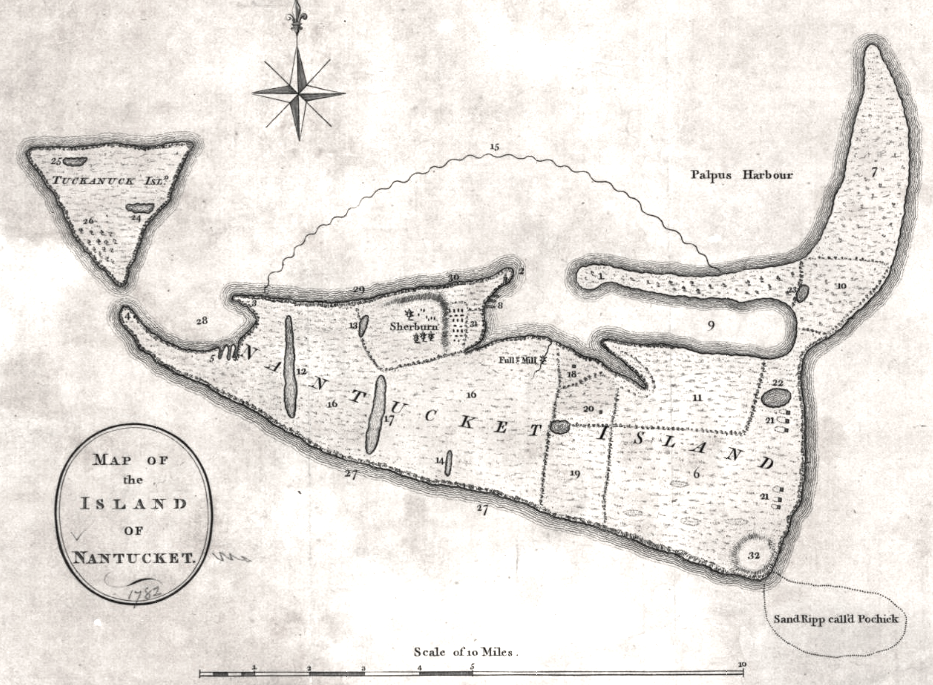
Map of the Island of Nantucket, 1782, by Crèvecœur

- 1712 – Sperm whaling begins.
- 1713 – Tuckernuck Island becomes part of Nantucket County.
- 1732 – Quaker meeting house built.
- 1746
  - Lighthouse and East Mill constructed.
  - The Old Mill an historic windmill.
- 1774 – Population: 4,545.
- 1775 – Nantucket tentatively states their neutrality during the American Revolutionary War.
- 1779 – April: British loyalists raid island.
- 1784 - Great Point Light established.
- 1795 – Town of Sherburne renamed "Nantucket."

== 19th century ==
- 1810
  - Second Congregational Meeting House incorporated.
  - Population: 6,807.
- 1814 – Nantucket declares neutrality in the US-British War of 1812.
- 1816 – May: Nantucket Gazette newspaper begins publication.
- 1817 – Fragment Society formed.
- 1820
  - Nantucket Mechanics' Social Library Society founded.
  - the Essex (whaleship), aboard which were mostly residents of the island, was sunk by a randy sperm whale;
  - Population: 7,266.
- 1821 – The Inquirer newspaper begins publication.
- 1822 - the Quaise Asylum was commissioned in 1822, and originally meant to house indigent, aged, and chronically ill
- 1823
  - Columbian Library Society founded.
  - United Methodist Church built.
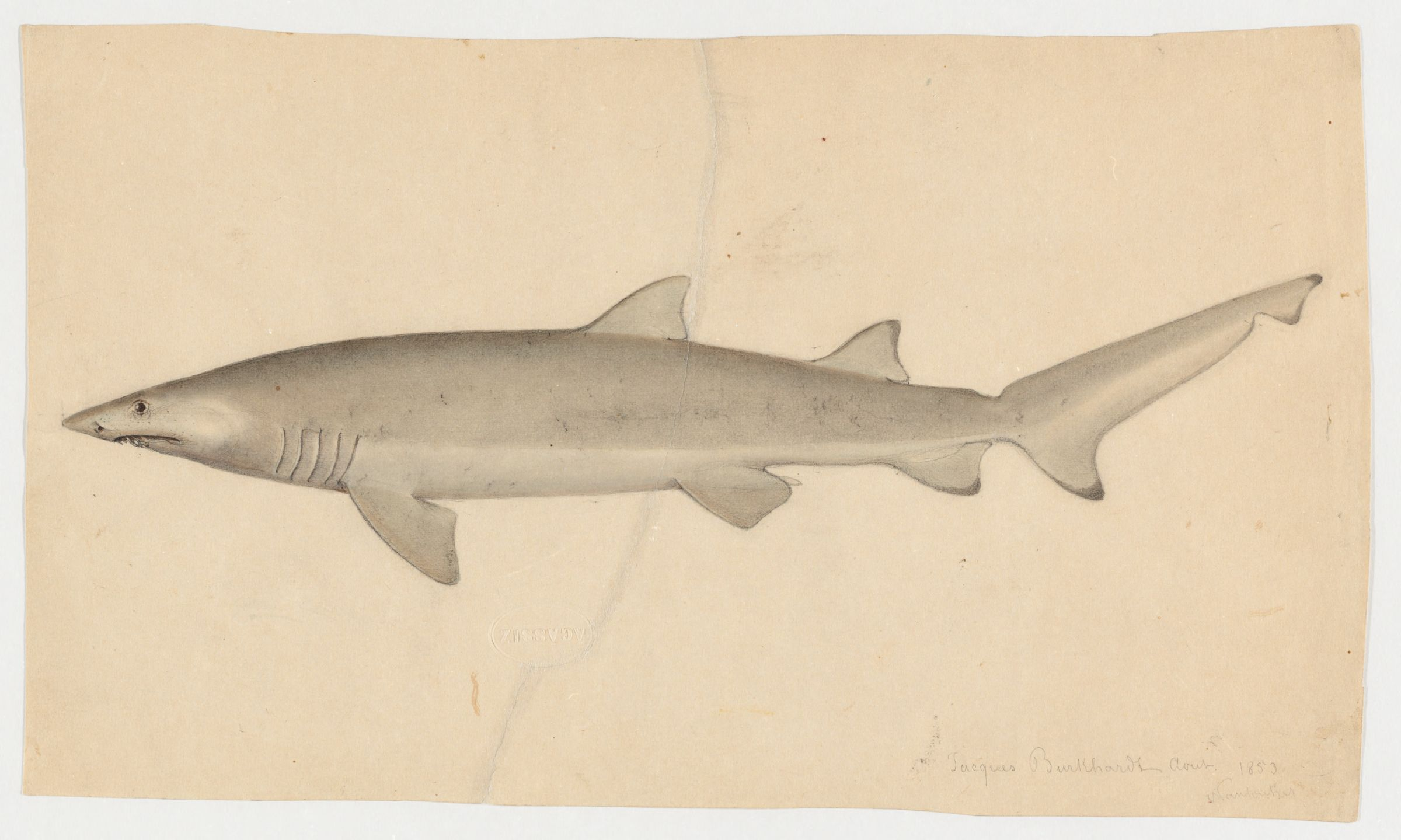
- 1853 drawing of a Nantucket shark, by Jacques Burkhardt
  1827 – United Library Association and Lancasterian school founded.
- 1834 – Nantucket Athenaeum incorporated.
- 1835
  - African Methodist Episcopal Church incorporated.
  - Silk Factory in business.
- 1836 – Ladies' Howard Society formed.
- 1838 - Nantucket High School established.
- 1839 – Trinity Church built.
- 1840 – First Baptist Church built.
- 1846 – Fire.
- 1848 – Atlantic House hotel in business in Siasconset.
- 1850 - Sankaty Head Light built.
- 1854 – Lightship Nantucket and Town Library established.
- 1855 - Death of Dorcas Honorable, Nantucket's last Native American Wampanoag Indian.
- 1856
  - Nantucket Agricultural Society founded.
  - Lighthouse rebuilt.
- 1864 – Josiah Freeman photography studio in business.
- 1866 – Union Benevolent Society founded.
- 1869 - Nantucket's last whaler sailed.
- 1873 – Nantucket Relief Association founded.
- 1875 – Civil War monument erected.
- 1877 – Sherburne Lyceum organized.
- 1881 – Nantucket Railroad built.
- 1883 – Siasconset Union Chapel, Nantucket Hotel, Surf-Side Hotel and Springfield Hotel built.
- 1886
  - Electric telegraph installed.
  - New Bedford, Martha's Vineyard, and Nantucket Steamboat Company formed.
  - Wyer's Art Store in business (approximate date).
- 1892 – Point Breeze Hotel in business.
- 1894 – Nantucket Historical Association founded.
- 1895 – Goldenrod Literary and Debating Society founded.

Original Nantucket Railroad reaches bankruptcy, Nantucket Central Railroad Company established

- 1897 – Church of St. Mary-Our Lady of the Isle built.

== 20th century ==
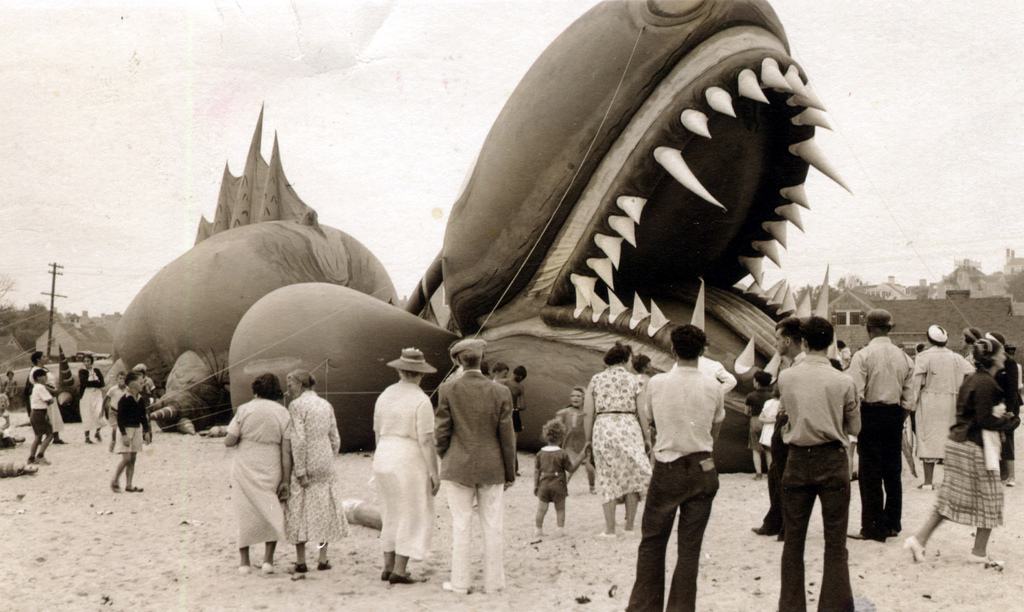
Nantucket, 1937

- 1901 – Brant Point Light rebuilt.
- 1902 – Maria Mitchell Association founded.
- 1908 – Maria Mitchell Observatory built.
- 1910 – Population: 2,962 (county).
- 1917 - Nantucket Central Railroad Company closes after all available trains were commandeered by the United States Army to serve in the Western Front of World War One
- 1923 – Sankaty Head Golf Club opens.
- 1925 – Nobska (steamship) begins operating in region.
- 1930 – Whaling Museum opens.
- 1934 - The LV-117 is sunk by RMS Olympic off the coast in a collision.
- 1940 – Straight Wharf Theatre established.
- 1945 – Murray's Toggery Shop in business.
- 1956 – July 25: SS Andrea Doria wrecked offshore.
- 1966 – Nantucket Historic District established.
- 1970 – Population: 3,774.
- 1972 – Hy-Line ferry begins operating.
- 1974 – Coskata-Coatue Wildlife Refuge established (approximate date).
- 1975 – Nantucket National Wildlife Refuge established.
- 1976 – December 15: MV Argo Merchant wrecked offshore.
- 1990 – Population: 6,012.
- 1995 – Nantucket Regional Transit Authority begins operating.
- 1997 – Bill Delahunt becomes U.S. representative for Massachusetts's 10th congressional district.
- 1999
  - October 31: EgyptAir Flight 990 crashes south of island, 217 dead.
  - African Meeting House restored.

== 21st century ==
- 2001 – Alliance to Protect Nantucket Sound organized.
- 2010
  - Cape Wind (wind farm) development approved.
  - Population: 10,172.
- 2011 – William R. Keating becomes U.S. representative for Massachusetts's 10th congressional district.
- 2020 – Nantucket introduces COVID-19 safety measures, including travel restrictions and mask mandates.

== See also ==
- History of Nantucket
- National Register of Historic Places listings in Nantucket County, Massachusetts
