= Adams Island (Massachusetts) =

Former island in Nantucket County, Massachusetts, United States

Coordinates: 41°18′59″N 70°18′25″W

Adams Island was an island in the U.S. state of Massachusetts.

== History ==
Adams Island was originally part of Tuckernuck Island. During the 1890s, the westernmost part of Tuckernuck extended almost to Muskeget Island and served as a barrier beach, protecting the Gravel Islands, western Dry Shoal, and Little Gull Island.

The island came into existence in 1902, when the Haulover Nor'easter severed it from Tuckernuck. Another island, Tombolo, was also created. In 1907, Adams almost attached itself to Muskeget, but failed to do so because the sea formed a narrow deep channel separating Adams from Muskeget.

In 1910, Adams' length was shortened due to a tropical storm and an autumn nor'easter. By 1920, Adams was less than four hundred meters long. A little less than ten meters of it remained in 1950, and by 1980 it was gone.
