= Madaket, Massachusetts =

- Census designated place
- Location in Nantucket County and the state of Massachusetts.
- Coordinates: 41°16′22″N 70°11′53″W
- Country: United States
- State: Massachusetts
- County: Nantucket

Area
  - Total: 2.41 sq mi (6.23 km^{2})
  - Land: 1.98 sq mi (5.14 km^{2})
  - Water: 0.42 sq mi (1.09 km^{2})
- Elevation: 26 ft (7.9 m)

Population (2020)
  - Total: 377
  - Density: 189.9/sq mi (73.31/km^{2})
- Time zone: UTC-5 (Eastern (EST))
  - Summer (DST): UTC-4 (EDT)
- ZIP Code: 02554 (Nantucket)
- Area code: 508
- FIPS code: 25-37735
- GNIS feature ID: 616708

Madaket (also Madaquet, Maddaket, Maddequet, Madeket, or Mattaket) is a census designated place (CDP) in Nantucket, Massachusetts, United States. As of the 2020 census, Madaket had a population of 377. Its elevation is 26 feet (8 m) on the western end of the island. The various spellings of its name led the Board on Geographic Names to designate its official spelling in 1966. It is also home to the Madaket Ditch, one of the earliest public works projects in America. It was also home to a famous islander by the name of Mildred Carpenter Jewett or more commonly known as "Madaket Millie".

== History ==
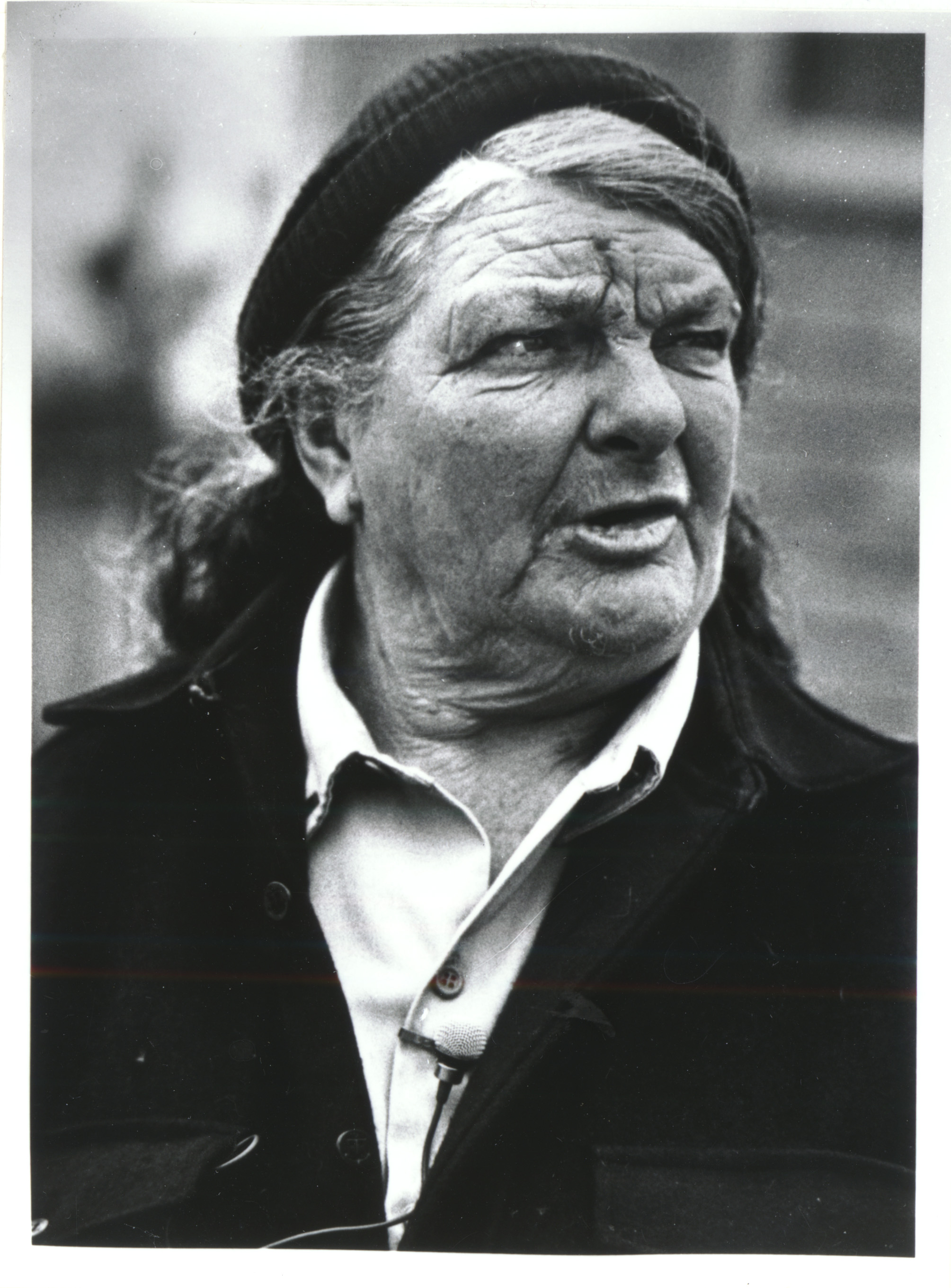
Mildred Carpenter Jewett, aka Madaket Millie

Madaket was home to Mildred Carpenter Jewett, a Nantucket native commonly referred to as "Madaket Millie" who spent much of her life in the area as a volunteer for the United States Coast Guard. Born in 1907, she served as a Coastal Defense Specialist during World War II, patrolling the shores for German submarines as well as training dogs to accompany military personnel during patrols. At one point, she discovered a live mine and towed it away from the shore, where it was disposed of by a Navy minesweeper.

On January 3, 1947, the same day that the Madaket Coast Guard Station was shut down, a Panamanian steamer called the Kotor ran aground near Madaket. Millie noticed the steamer, and her quick actions in alerting the Coast Guard and organizing a rescue mission were credited with the saving of the ship and crew. Millie continued to serve the Coast Guard on the island in various roles until her death in 1990. She was promoted to the rank of honorary officer in 1965, and she received the agency's Meritorious Public Service Commendation in 1975.

== Geography ==
Madaket is located at the western end of Nantucket island. According to the U.S. Census Bureau, the CDP has a total area of 2.4 mi^{2} (6.2 km^{2}). 2.0 mi^{2} (5.1 km^{2}) of it is land and 0.39 mi^{2} (1.0 km^{2}) of it (17%) is water.

== Demographics ==
Historical population
Census	Pop.	Note	%±
2020	377		—
U.S. Decennial Census
