= National Register of Historic Places listings in Nantucket County, Massachusetts =

Location of Nantucket County in Massachusetts

This is a list of the National Register of Historic Places listings in Nantucket County, Massachusetts.

This is intended to be a complete list of the properties and districts on the National Register of Historic Places in Nantucket County, Massachusetts, United States. Latitude and longitude coordinates are provided for many National Register properties and districts; these locations may be seen together in a map.

There are 4 properties listed on the National Register in the county, including 2 National Historic Landmarks. Another property was once listed but has been removed.

Contents: Counties in Massachusetts

Barnstable | Berkshire | Bristol | Dukes | Essex | Franklin | Hampden | Hampshire | Middlesex | Nantucket | Norfolk | Plymouth | Suffolk | Worcester

This National Park Service list is complete through NPS recent listings posted November 21, 2025.

== Current listings ==
| | Name on the Register | Image | Date listed | Location | City or town | Description |
|---|---|---|---|---|---|---|
| 1 | Brant Point Light Station | Brant Point Light Station | September 28, 1987 (#87002029) | Brant Pt. 41°17′20″N 70°05′34″W | Nantucket town | 1856 lighthouse at the entrance to Nantucket Harbor |
| 2 | Jethro Coffin House | Jethro Coffin House | November 24, 1968 (#68000019) | Sunset Hill; 41°17′15″N 70°06′25″W | Nantucket town | The oldest house on the island |
| 3 | Nantucket Historic District | Nantucket Historic District | November 13, 1966 (#66000772) | Nantucket Island; 41°17′30″N 70°04′04″W | | Historic district encompassing the entire island, as well as the small islands of Tuckernuck and Muskeget. |
| 4 | Sankaty Head Light | Sankaty Head Light | October 15, 1987 (#87002028) | Sankaty Head, Nantucket Island; 41°16′58″N 69°58′09″W | Siasconset | 1860 lighthouse at the eastern point of the island |

== Former listing ==
| | Name on the Register | Image | Date listed | Date removed | Location | City or town | Description |
|---|---|---|---|---|---|---|---|
| 1 | Nantucket Light | Nantucket Light | April 28, 1982 (#82005272) | 1986 | 41°23′25″N 70°02′54″W | Nantucket, Massachusetts | Also known as Great Point Light. The original toppled in a storm in March 1984; it was replaced with a replica in 1986. |

== See also ==
- List of National Historic Landmarks in Massachusetts
- National Register of Historic Places listings in Massachusetts
