= Muskeget Island Airport =

- IATA: none; ICAO: none; FAA LID: MA55

Summary
- Airport type: Private
- Operator: Donald Little, Crocker Snow Jr., and Patricia Moseley; Town of Nantucket
- Location: Muskeget Island
- Elevation AMSL: 6 ft / 2 m
- Coordinates: 41°20′5.44″N 70°17′58.07″W

Map
- Location of airport in Massachusetts

Runways
Direction	Length		Surface
Direction	ft	m	Surface
NE/SW	1,100	335	Sand/Grass

Muskeget Island Airport (FAA LID: MA55) is a small privately owned turf landing strip 1100' in length x 25' in width (335m x 8m) located on Muskeget Island in the town of Nantucket. It is barely maintained and mostly overgrown, and although technically reserved for emergency use only, pilots using STOL aircraft will occasionally attempt to land there.

The airport, along with two-thirds of the island, are owned by retired reporter Crocker Snow Jr., whose father built the airstrip.
