= Jethro Coffin House =

Historic house in Massachusetts, United States

- Oldest House
- U.S. National Register of Historic Places
- U.S. National Historic Landmark
- U.S. National Historic Landmark District – Contributing property
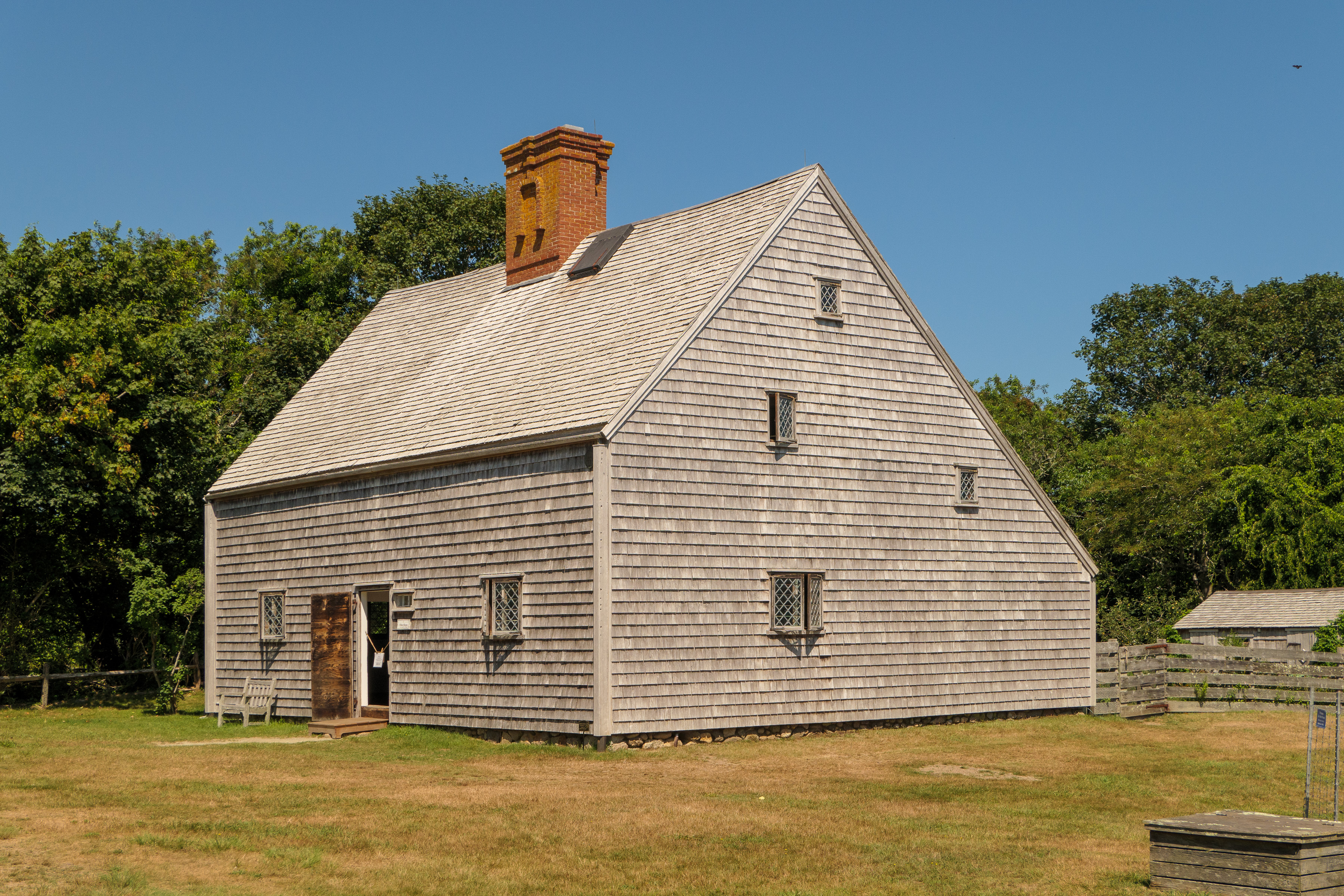
- Jethro Coffin House

- Location within Massachusetts Location within the United States
- Location: Sunset Hill Road, Nantucket, Massachusetts
- Coordinates: 41°17′15″N 70°6′25″W
- Area: 0.75 acres (0.30 ha)
- Built: 1686
- Architectural style: Early English Settler
- Part of: Nantucket Historic District (ID66000772)
- NRHP reference No.: 68000019

Significant dates
- Added to NRHP: November 24, 1968
- Designated NHL: November 24, 1968
- Designated NHLDCP: November 13, 1966

The Oldest House on Sunset Hill, also known as the Jethro Coffin House, was built in 1686 and is believed to be the oldest residence on Nantucket still on its original site. The island's English population at the time totaled several hundred, and the native Wampanoag outnumbered them by at least three to one.

Built as a wedding gift for Jethro Coffin (1663–1727) and Mary Gardner (1670–1767), the house represents the unity of two of the island's oldest families. Jethro was the grandson of one of the island's original proprietors, Tristram Coffin, and Mary was the daughter of John Gardner, one of the leaders of the so-called Half-Share Revolt, in which the island's tradesmen rallied against the wealthier full-share proprietors. Although the relationship between Gardner and Coffin was never amicable, the marriage of Mary and Jethro helped unite the families and soothe old wounds. Built on Gardner land using Coffin lumber, the house is a physical manifestation of this unity.

By the late nineteenth century, the house was abandoned and had fallen into disrepair, but a Coffin family reunion held on the island in 1881 ignited renewed interest in the property. The Nantucket Historical Association acquired the house in 1923, and four years later, the Society for the Preservation of New England Antiquities (SPNEA, now Historic New England), commenced an extensive reconstruction in an attempt to return the house to its historic appearance. The Oldest House was designated a National Historic Landmark in 1968. In 1987, it was struck by lightning, which caused extensive damage necessitating substantial repairs to and partial reconstruction of the roof and chimney.

Today, the house stands as a monument to the lives of the island's earliest English settlers and offers visitors a glimpse of daily life on Nantucket in the seventeenth century. It is now a historic house museum owned and operated by the Nantucket Historical Association. It is also a contributing element of the Nantucket Historic District, a National Historic Landmark District.

== Kitchen garden ==
Efforts have been made to restore the landscape surrounding the Oldest House to an appearance more appropriate to its historic setting. The kitchen garden, located behind the house, is a reconstruction of a circa-1700 herb and vegetable garden and is maintained without the use of modern fertilizers, herbicides, or pesticides. Plants are grown in a raised-bed system typical of the time and include common vegetable staples such as carrots, onions, cabbages, and parsnips, as well as approximately thirty varieties of herbs grown for culinary, medicinal, or household use.

== Detailed history ==
Mary lived on Sunset Hill for about twenty years. Although the date of construction of the house is not known exactly, tradition says that it was built as a wedding present for the couple in 1686, when sixteen-year-old Mary married twenty-three-year-old Jethro Coffin.

Like the view from the house, the dwelling itself had a different appearance in the seventeenth century, although we can't be certain exactly what it was. It was an impressive house for its time, two stories in height on the south-facing front facade, with a long, sloping north roof sometimes called a “catslide,” which may be an original feature. Massive fireplaces were the dominant features of the rooms on each floor: the parlor on the west side, the hall, or great room, on the east, and the lean-to kitchen in the rear, under the low-hanging roof. Two chambers, or bedrooms, were on the second floor, with an attic above. Physical evidence indicates that the center-chimney dwelling originally featured twin front gables that allowed light into the second-floor rooms, and from that height on the hill the Coffins and their children could see for miles.

Mary and Jethro sold their Nantucket dwelling to Nathaniel Paddack in 1708 and moved to Mendon, Massachusetts, when Jethro inherited property there.

Although the Oldest House is closely associated with Mary and Jethro Coffin, four generations of the Paddack family lived there. Many of them were mariners, reflecting Nantucket's change from an agricultural to a maritime community in the eighteenth century. In 1839, George Paddack sold the house out of the family to a cooper named George Turner for $300, ending a hundred and thirty-one years of Paddack ownership.

By 1867, George and Mary Turner found another place to live, and the ancient nuptial dwelling of Jethro and Mary Coffin was used as a hay barn.

In 1881, two off-island members of the Coffin family purchased the Jethro Coffin house from the Turner family for $300. Repairs were made and the house was opened up in 1886 for its 200th anniversary, then settled down for a long sleep until 1897, when it was opened in the summers as a house museum. The house attracted a constant stream of curious visitors eager to peer into a relic of the early history of the island.

The Nantucket Historical Association purchased Jethro and Mary's dwelling from Tristram Coffin in 1923. Winthrop Coffin of Boston — another off-island descendant of the original Tristram — stepped up to fund restoration of the house and his architect of choice, Alfred F. Shurrocks, began the work in 1927. Although Shurrocks determined that the house had originally had twin front gables, a decision was made to restore the structure to its more familiar appearance and to replace eighteenth-century double-hung sash windows with diamond-paned casements, which they felt more suited a seventeenth-century dwelling.

The Jethro Coffin house was designated a National Historic Landmark by the Secretary of the Interior in 1968. On October 1, 1987, lightning struck the house, toppling the chimney, destroying half of the roof, and melting the electrical wiring, causing damage that required two years (and about a million dollars) to mend. The structure was so solidly built that since restoration it has continued to hold firm on Sunset Hill, where it tells the story of the early English settlement of Nantucket in the seventeenth century.

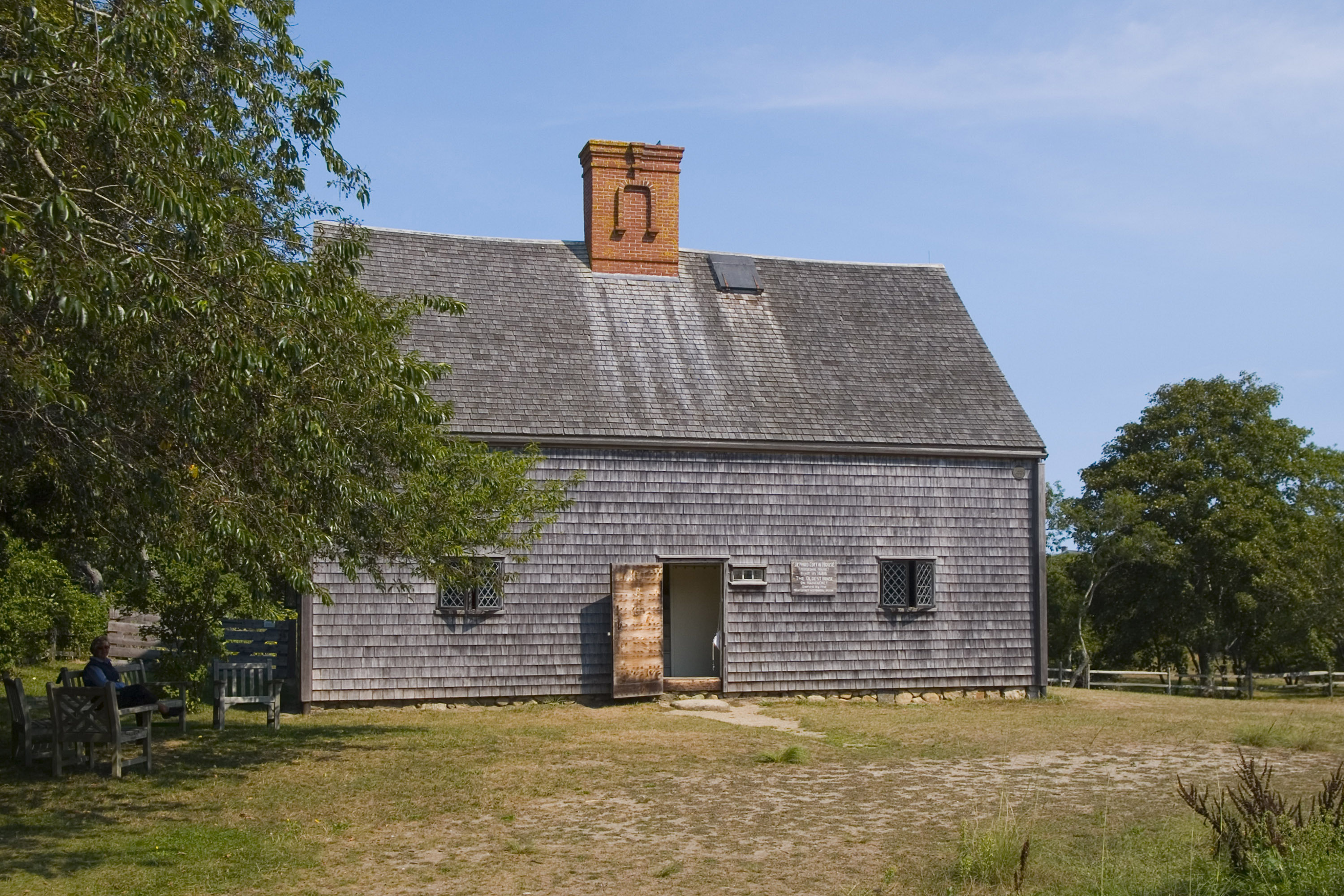

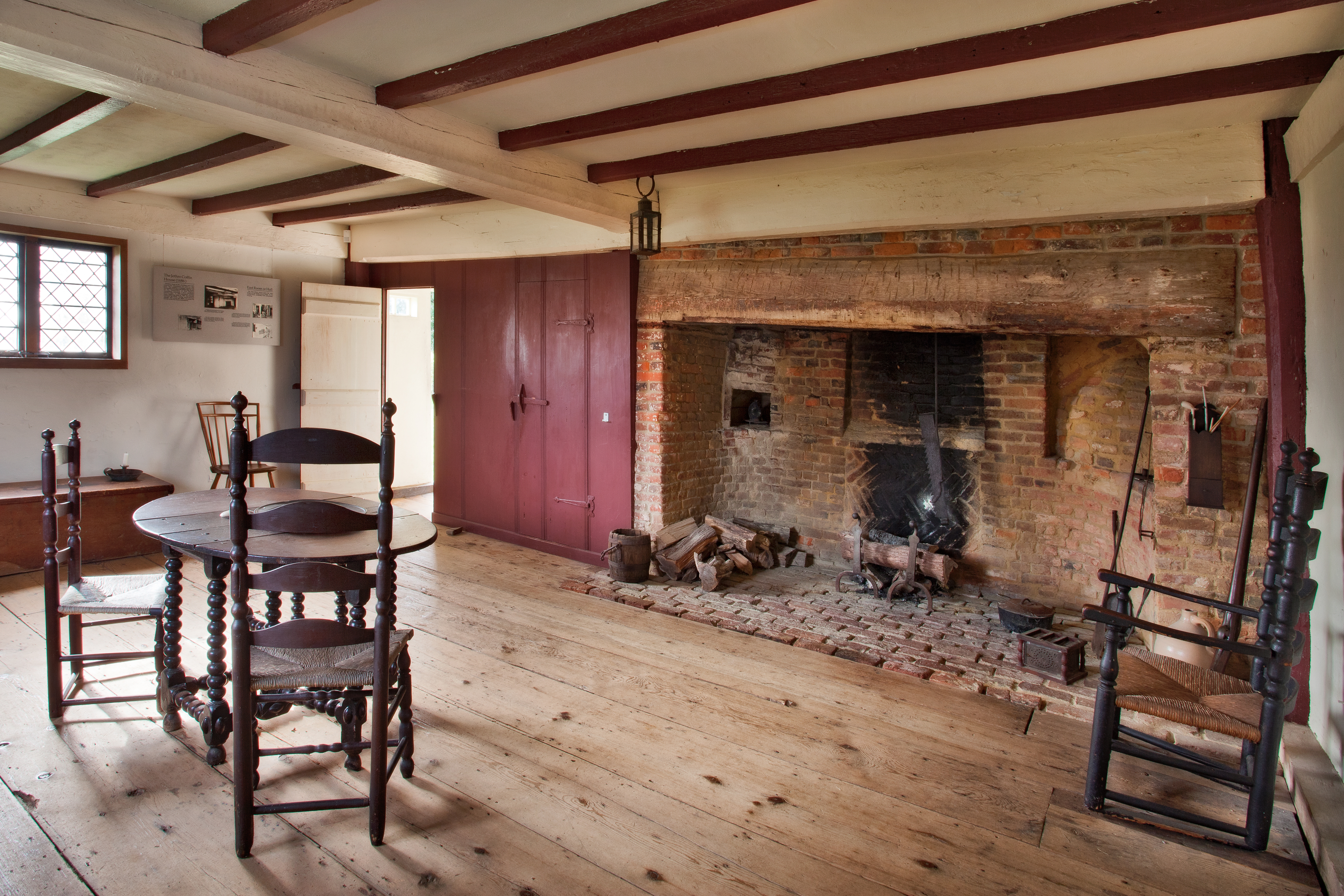

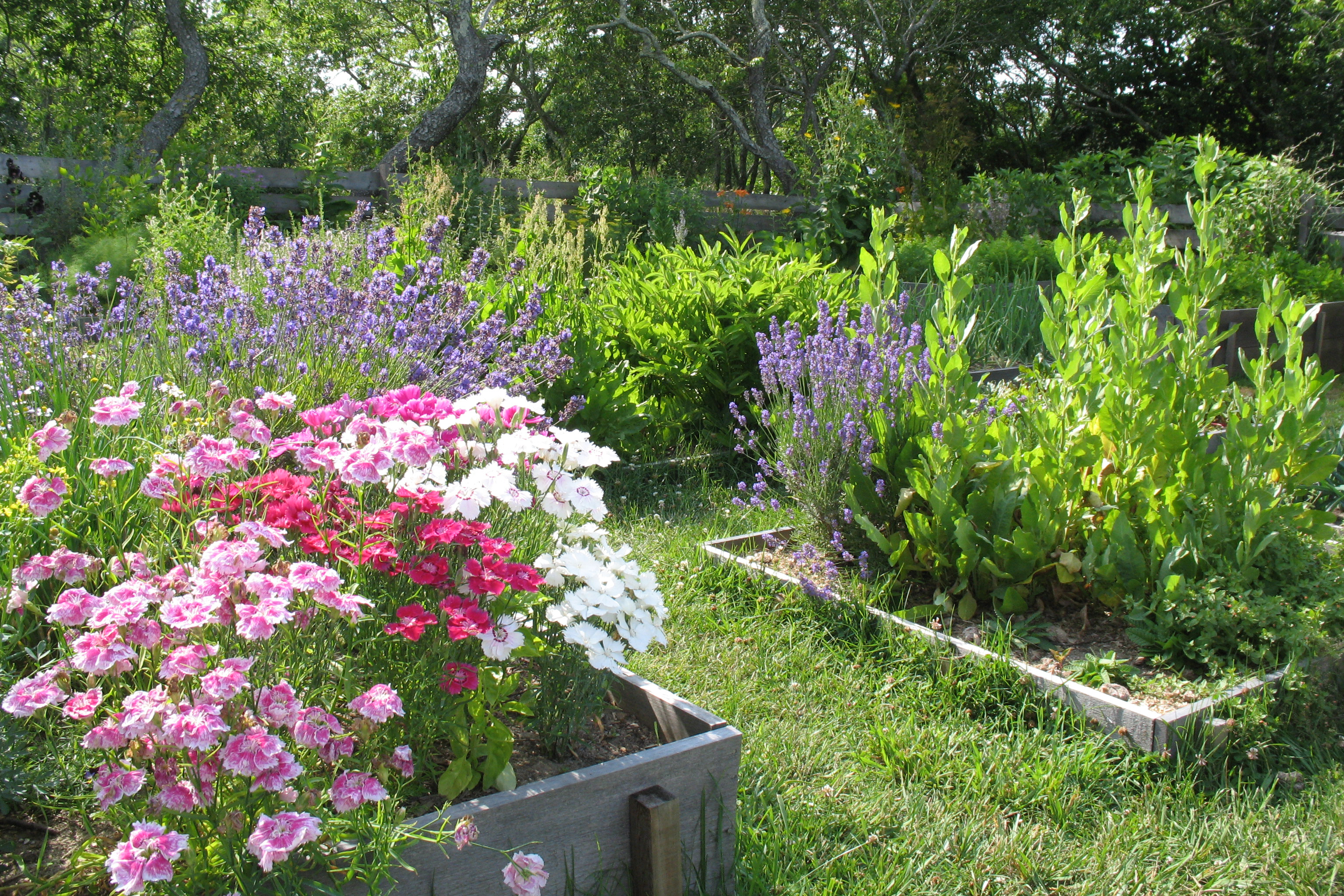

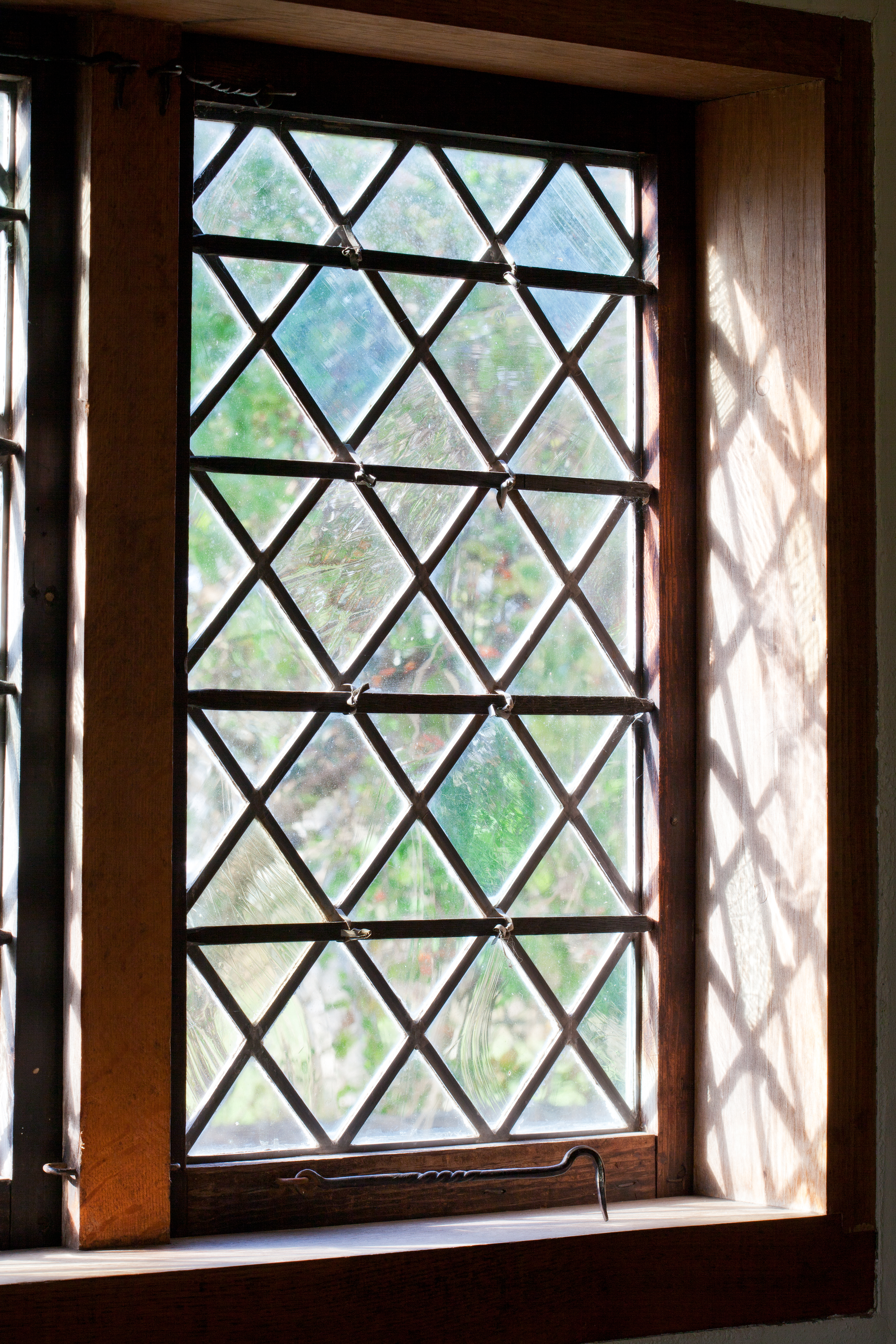

== See also ==
- National Register of Historic Places listings in Nantucket County, Massachusetts
- List of National Historic Landmarks in Massachusetts
- List of the oldest buildings in Massachusetts
- Coffin (whaling family)
