= Nantucket Historic District =

Historic district in Massachusetts, United States

Coordinates: 41°16′59.61″N 70°05′51.29″W

- U.S. National Register of Historic Places
- U.S. National Historic Landmark District
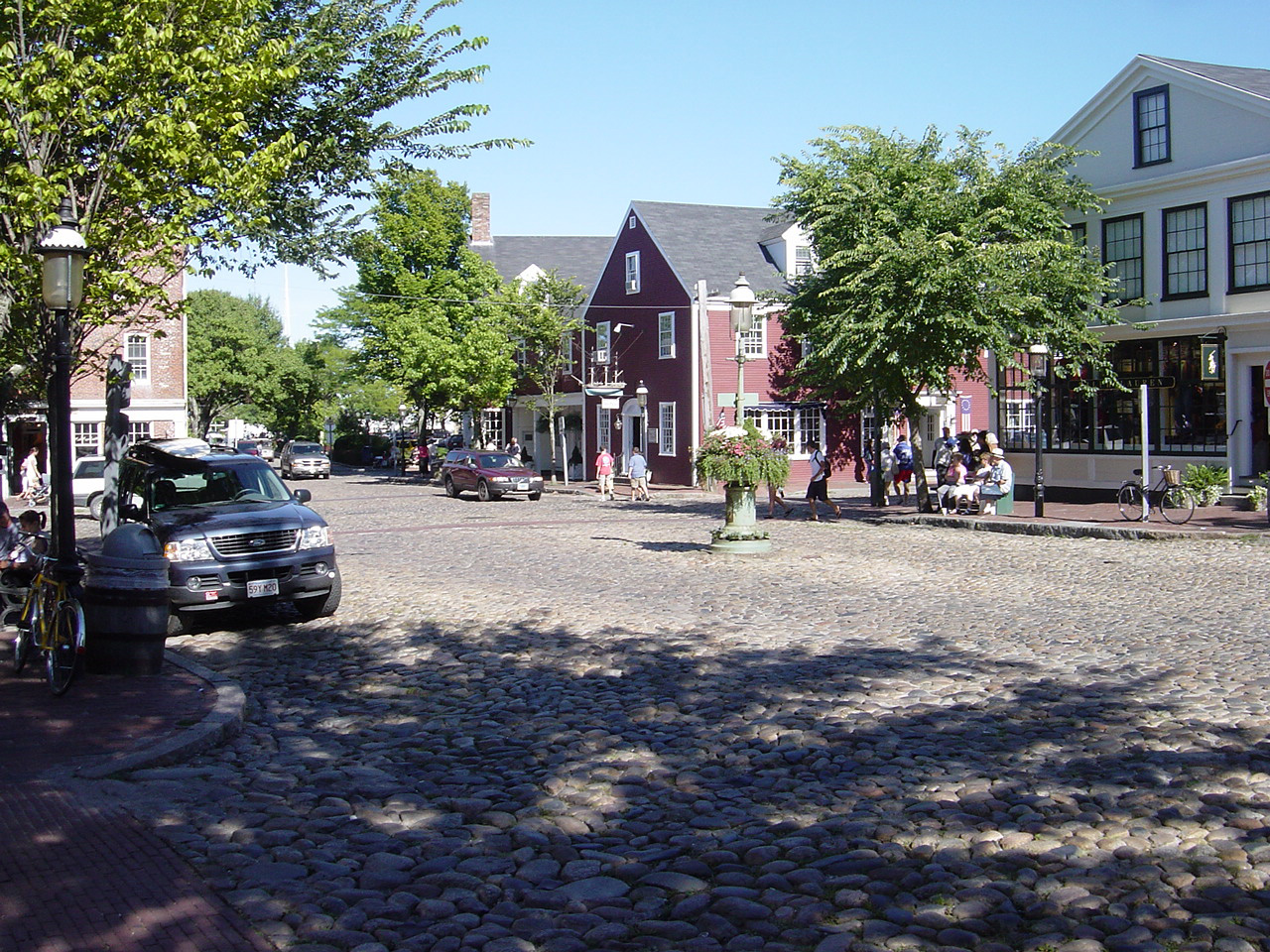
- Main Street, Nantucket

- Location within Massachusetts Location within the United States
- Location: all of Nantucket Island, Nantucket, Massachusetts
- Area: 30,000 acres (12,000 ha)
- Built: 1686 to 1849
- NRHP reference No.: 66000772

Significant dates
- Added to NRHP: December 13, 1966
- Designated NHLD: November 13, 1966

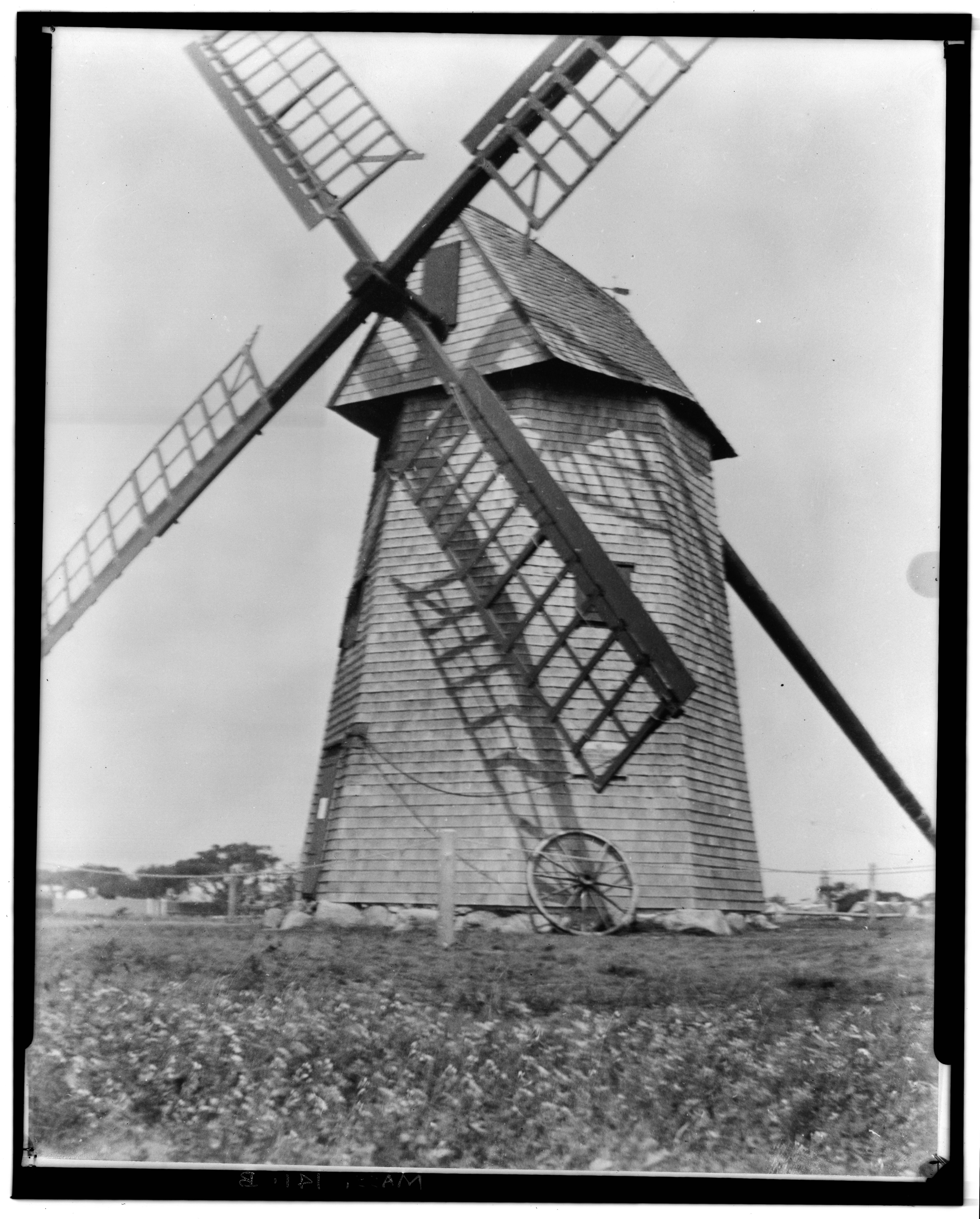
The Old Mill in 1935

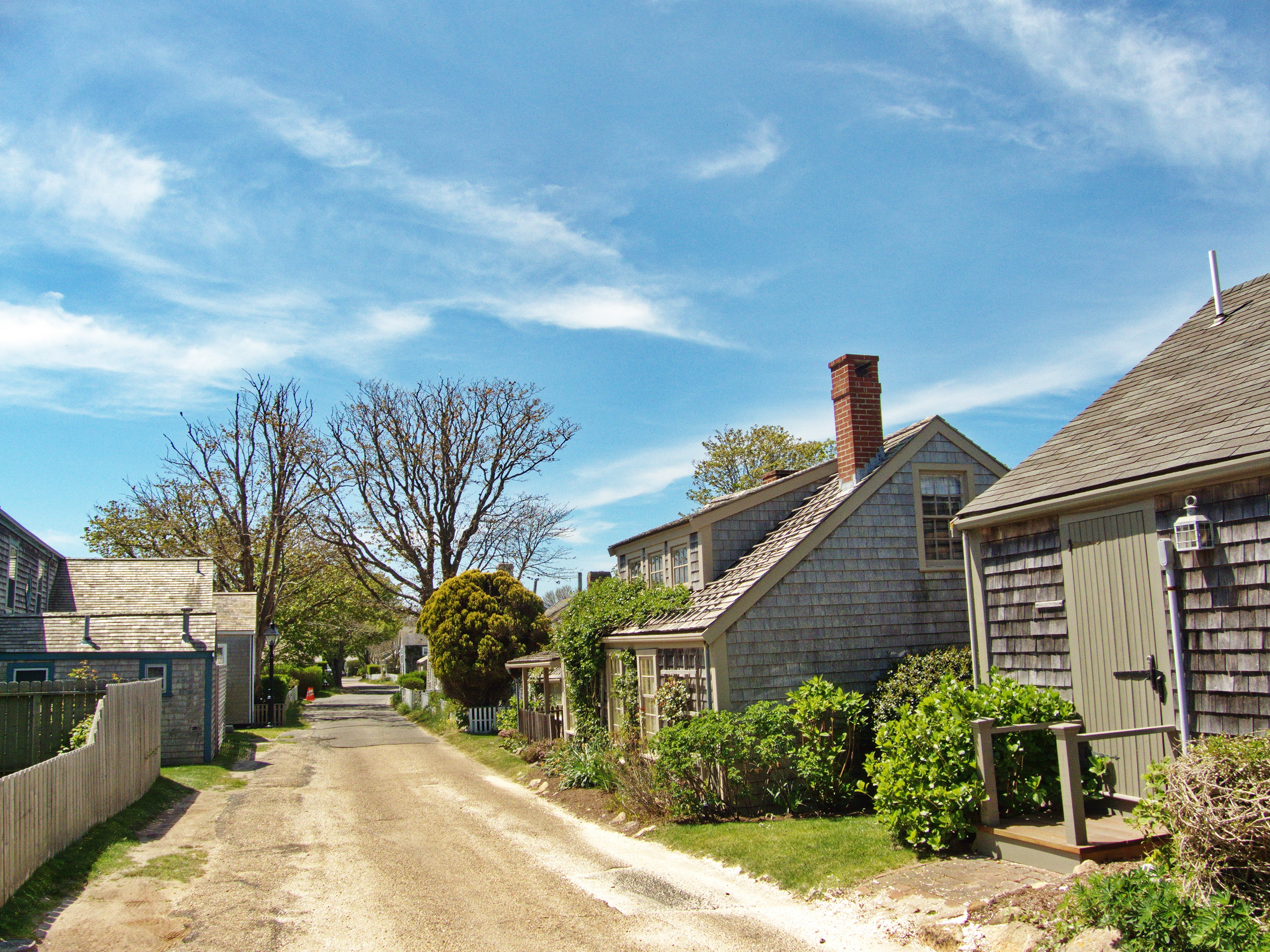
Historic cottages in Siasconset

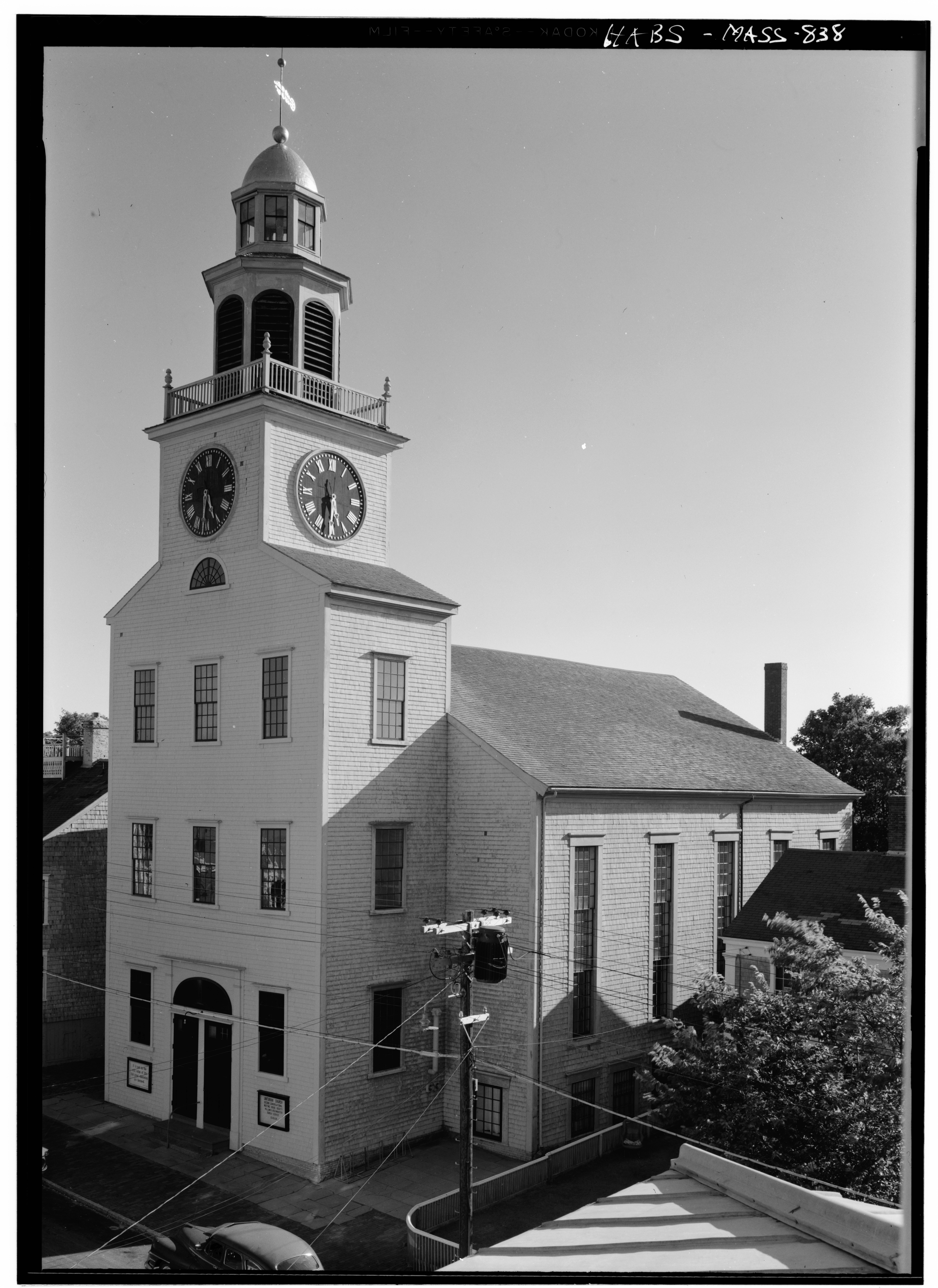
Second Congregational Meeting House (1809) (now the Unitarian Universalist Church)

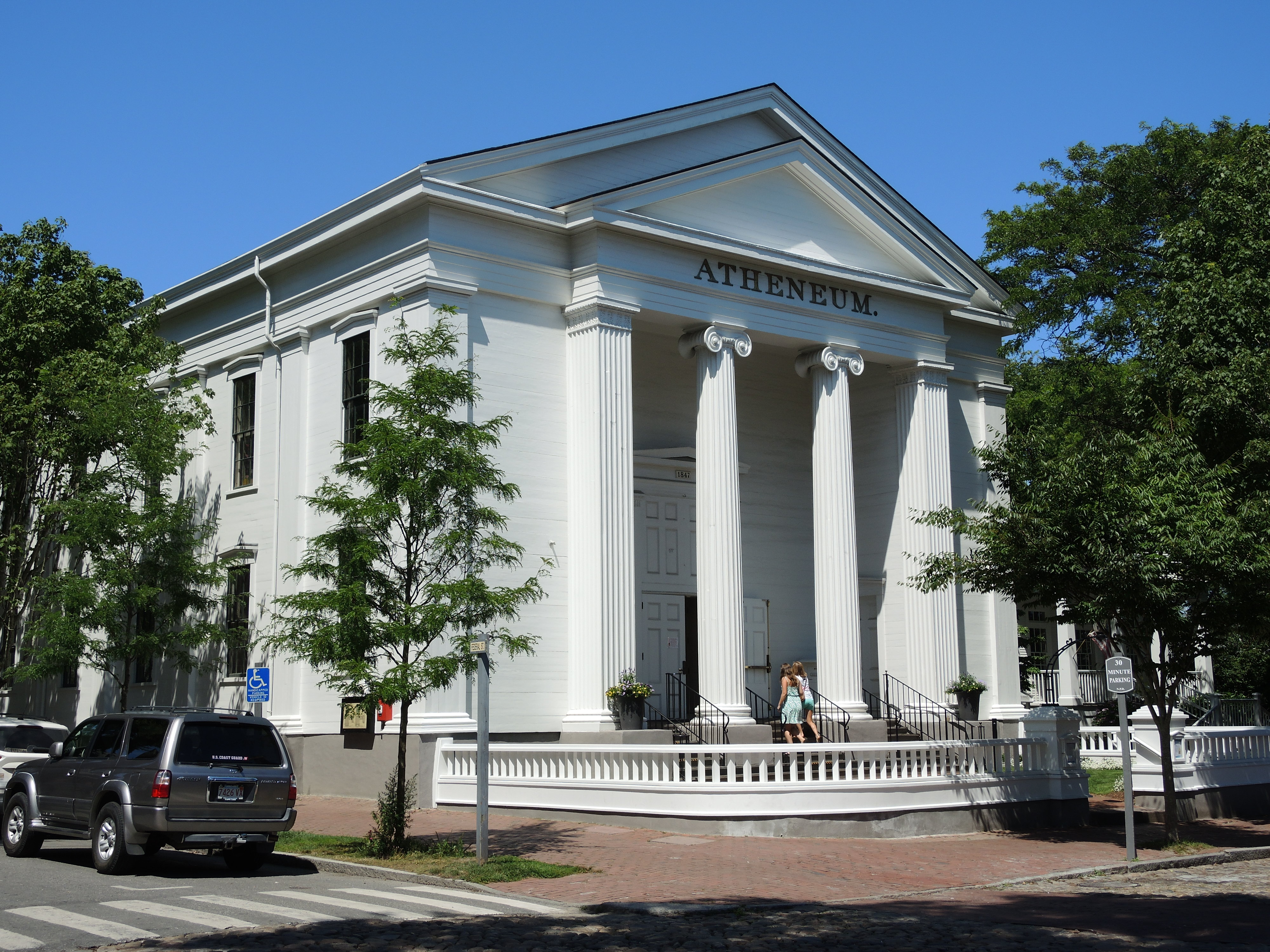
Nantucket Atheneum

The Nantucket Historic District is a National Historic Landmark District that encompasses the entire island of Nantucket, Massachusetts. The original December 13, 1966 listing on the National Register of Historic Places included only the historic downtown core and the village of Siasconset, but was expanded in 1975 to include the entire island, as well as the islands of Tuckernuck and Muskeget. At over 30,000 acres, it is the largest conventional National Historic Landmark District by area in the contiguous United States.

Much of the district was originally designated as a local historic district in 1955, making it one of the earliest historic districts in the United States, along with the Charleston Historic District in Charleston, South Carolina, the Vieux Carre Historic District in New Orleans, and the Old and Historic Alexandria District in Alexandria, Virginia. Since 1955, the Nantucket Historic District Commission has been the governing authority charged with overseeing the island's preservation.

== History ==
Nantucket is a uniquely preserved New England seaport, largely developed during the late 18th and early 19th centuries when the whaling industry dominated the town's economy. By 1774, Nantucket accounted for about sixty percent of the New England whaling fleet. In 1840, the town's population peaked at roughly 9,000. However, during the years that followed, several events occurred that resulted in a dramatic downturn in the island's fortunes. By this time, the nearby mainland port of New Bedford, Massachusetts had surpassed Nantucket as the leading whaling port in the nation. Also during this time, the formation of sand bars prevented the increasingly larger ships from entering Nantucket Harbor, forcing the industry to shift to nearby Edgartown on Martha's Vineyard. Another blow came in 1846, when a great fire destroyed much of the town's commercial center and wharves. By the end of the 19th century, when much of the country was experiencing dramatic growth, Nantucket's population had fallen to just 3,000. Thus, the existence of Nantucket's historic buildings is largely due to the island being forgotten for more than half a century, as its architecture survived through neglect. In 1894, the first preservation efforts on Nantucket occurred with a campaign to save the "Old Mill", a 1746 windmill built by Nathan Wilbur. In 1897, the mill was purchased at auction and donated to the Nantucket Historical Association. During this period, new construction began to reflect the island's historic character.

The oldest buildings within the historic district date from the late 17th century. Built mostly of wood, they are utilitarian in style with little ornamentation or detail. In the period that followed the American Revolution, with the rise in whaling wealth, more ornate buildings were constructed by sea captains and merchants in the Federal style. Among these is the Second Congressional Meetinghouse, built in 1809. The most outstanding buildings are situated on Main and Orange Streets, such as the Hadwen-Wright House at 94 Main Street. Immediately following the devastating fire of 1846, the entire commercial district was rebuilt with new two and three-story brick buildings. The rebuilt area is dominated by the predominant Greek Revival style of the 1840s.

It was not until the 1990s that Nantucket's population surpassed its 1840 peak of 9,000. The island's economy is now mostly based on seasonal tourism, which has put increased pressure on its historic properties. In 2000, the National Trust for Historic Preservation placed Nantucket on its 2000 list of America's 11 Most Endangered Historic Places, noting that while "Nantucket has a long history of commitment to preservation, an upsurge in the destructive practices of "teardowns" and "gut rehabs," along with the inappropriate sizing and siting of new homes, are dramatically altering the heritage, cultural landscape, and quality of community life on the island."

== Contributing properties ==
A partial list of contributing properties within the Nantucket Historic District includes:

- The Old Mill (1746)
- Old Gaol (1806)
- Quaker (Friends) Meeting House (1838)
- Nantucket Atheneum (1847)
- St. Paul's Church (1901)

== See also ==
- National Register of Historic Places listings in Nantucket County, Massachusetts
- List of National Historic Landmarks in Massachusetts
