= Public works =

Broad category of infrastructure projects, financed and constructed by the government

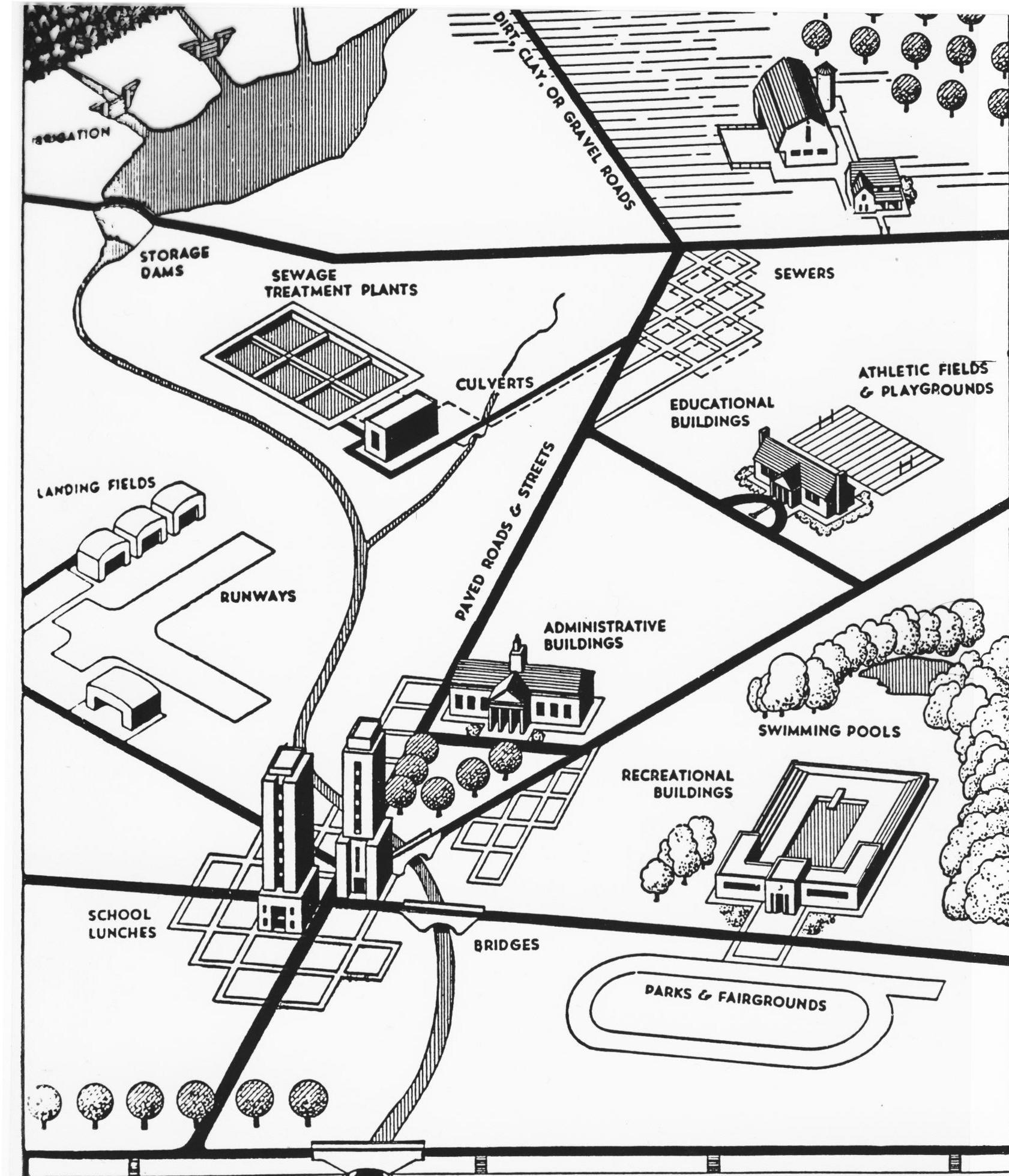
A US government poster from 1940 summarizing the Works Progress Administration's achievements

Public works are a broad category of infrastructure projects, financed and procured by a government body for employment, health and safety, and recreational uses in the greater community. They include environmental protection (drinking water protection, preservation and restoration of forests and wetlands, soil erosion reduction, wildlife habitat preservation), public buildings (hospitals, municipal buildings, and schools), public services (dams, electrical grid, sewage treatment, and water supply and treatment), public spaces (beaches, parks, and public squares), transport infrastructure (airports, bridges, canals, pipelines, ports, railroads, and roads) and other, usually long-term, physical assets and facilities. Though often interchangeable with public capital and public infrastructure, public works does not necessarily include an economic component, making it a broader term. Construction may be undertaken either by directly employed labour or by a private operator.

Public works have been encouraged since antiquity. The Roman emperor Nero encouraged the construction of various infrastructure projects during a period of widespread deflation.

== Overview ==
Public works is a multi-dimensional concept in economics and politics, touching on multiple arenas including: recreation (parks, beaches, trails), aesthetics (trees, green space), economy (goods and people movement, energy), law (police and courts), and neighborhood (community centers, social services buildings). It represents any constructed object that augments a nation's physical infrastructure.

Municipal infrastructure, urban infrastructure, and rural development usually represent the same concept but imply either large cities or developing nations' concerns respectively. The terms public infrastructure and critical infrastructure are sometimes used interchangeably. Critical infrastructure includes public works (dams, wastewater systems, bridges, etc.) as well as facilities like hospitals, banks, and telecommunications systems, and views them from a national security perspective and the impact on the community that the loss of such facilities would entail.

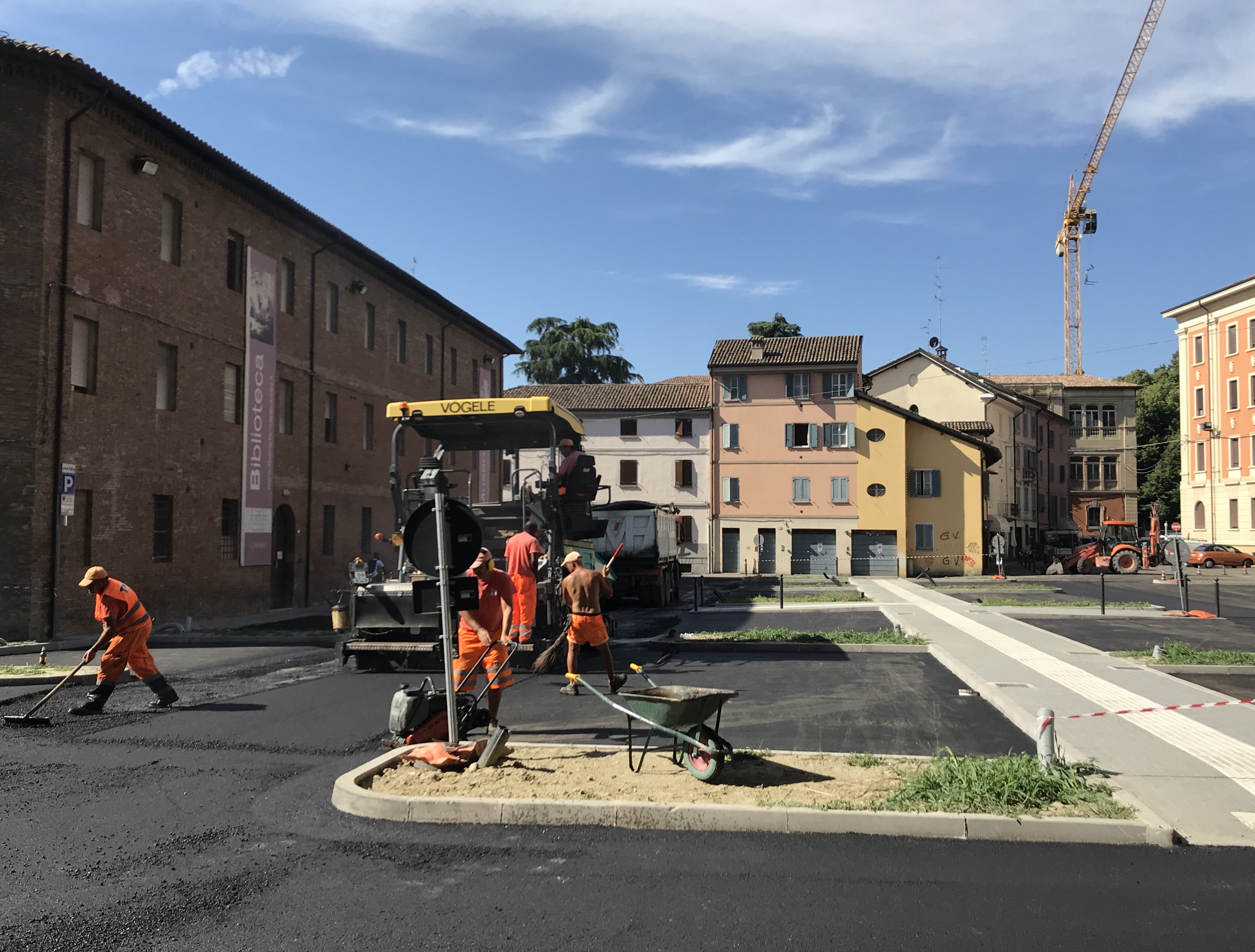
Public works in Reggio Emilia, Emilia-Romagna, Italy

The term public works has recently been expanded to include digital public infrastructure projects. For example, in the United States, the first nationwide digital public works project is an effort to create an open source software platform for e-voting (created and managed by the Open Source Digital Voting Foundation).

Reflecting increased concern with sustainability, urban ecology and quality of life, efforts to move towards sustainable municipal infrastructure are common in developed nations, especially in the European Union and Canada (where the FCM InfraGuide provides an officially mandated best practice exchange to move municipalities in that direction).

== Public works programmes ==
A public employment programme or public works programme is the provision of employment by the creation of predominantly public goods at a prescribed wage for those unable to find alternative employment. This functions as a form of social safety net. Public works programmes are activities that entail the payment of a wage (in cash or in kind) by the state, or by an Agent (or cash-for-work/CFW). One particular form of public works, that of offering a short-term period of employment, has come to dominate practice, particularly in regions such as Sub-Saharan Africa. Applied in the short term, this is appropriate as a response to transient shocks and acute labour market crises.

Investing in public works projects to stimulate the overall economy has been a popular policy measure since the economic crisis of the 1930s. Spearheaded by U.S. Secretary of Labor Frances Perkins, the first female Cabinet member in the United States, the New Deal resulted in the creation of programs such as the Civilian Conservation Corps, Public Works Administration, and the Works Progress Administration, among others, all of which created public goods through labor and infrastructure investments.

More recent examples are the 2008–2009 Chinese economic stimulus program, India's National Infrastructure Pipeline of 2020, the 2008 European Union stimulus plan, and the American Recovery and Reinvestment Act of 2009.

== Utility of investment ==
While it is argued that capital investment in public works can reduce unemployment, opponents of internal improvement programs argue that such projects should be undertaken by the private sector, not the public sector, because public works projects are often inefficient and costly to taxpayers. Further, some argue that public works, when used excessively by a government, are characteristic of socialism and other public or collectivist forms of government because of their 'tax and spend' policies aimed at achieving long-term economic improvement. However, in the private sector, entrepreneurs bear their own losses, so private-sector firms are generally unwilling to undertake projects that could result in losses or fail to develop a revenue stream. Governments will invest in public works because of the overall benefit to society when there is no private-sector benefit (a project that does not generate revenue) or when the risk is too great for a private company to accept on its own.

According to research conducted at Aalborg University, 86% of public works projects incur cost overruns. Some findings of the research were the following:

- Technically difficult projects were not more likely to exceed the budget than less difficult projects.
- Projects in which more people were directly and indirectly affected by the project turned out to be more susceptible to cost overruns.
- Project managers generally did not learn from similar projects attempted in the past.

Contracts awarded through public tenders include a provision for unexpected expenses (cost overruns), typically capped at 10% of the contract value. This money is spent during the course of the project only if the construction managers deem it necessary, and the expenditure must typically be justified in writing.

== See also ==
- Contingencies fund
- Department of transportation
- E-procurement
- Infrastructure
- Internal improvements
- Madaket Ditch, one of the first public works projects in America
- Make-work job
- Public capital
- Public good, an economic discussion
- Utility district

=== Individual programs ===
- Egyptian Public Works
- New Deal
- Opera Publica
- Public Works Administration
