= Tuckernuck Airport =

Tuckernuck Island Airport
- IATA: none; ICAO: none; FAA LID: MA72

Summary
- Airport type: Private
- Operator: Richard Limeburner
- Location: Tuckernuck Island
- Elevation AMSL: 23 ft / 7 m
- Coordinates: 41°17′51.00″N 70°15′37.50″W

Map
- Location of airport in Massachusetts

Runways
Direction	Length		Surface
Direction	ft	m	Surface
N/S	600	183	Turf

Tuckernuck Island Airport (FAA LID: MA72) is a small, unpaved airstrip located on Tuckernuck Island in the town of Nantucket. It is privately owned and currently has one aircraft, a Cessna 185, based there. It has one runway. The south end of the runway meets the water of the north Atlantic Ocean, while the north end meets the islands forests and grasslands. There is one shed on the east side. The runway length is decreasing due to sea level rise and beach erosion, which are naturally occurring and not necessarily attributable to climate change.
