= The Old Mill (Nantucket, Massachusetts) =

- U.S. National Register of Historic Places
- U.S. National Historic Landmark District – Contributing property
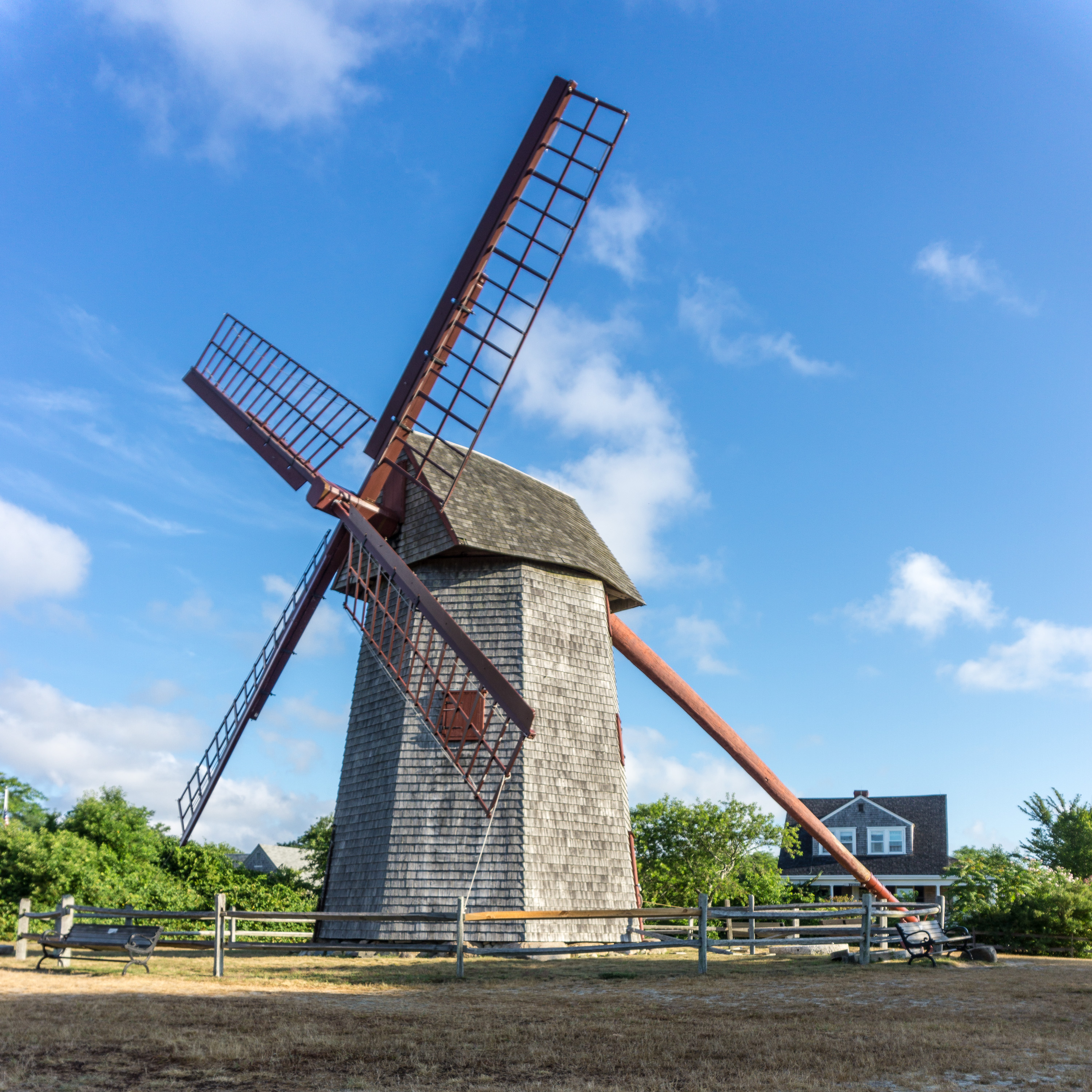
- 2015 photo
- Location: Nantucket, Massachusetts
- Coordinates: 41°16′38″N 70°6′5″W
- Area: Nantucket Historic District
- Built: 1746
- Website: https://www.nha.org/sites/oldmill.html
- NRHP reference No.: 66000772
- Added to NRHP: 1966

The Old Mill is a historic windmill located at 50 Prospect Street in Nantucket, Massachusetts. Built in 1746, it is the oldest functioning mill in the United States. The mill is owned and operated by the Nantucket Historical Association as a museum. It is a contributing property of the Nantucket Historic District. In 1992, it was also designated as a Historic Mechanical Engineering Landmark by the American Society of Mechanical Engineers.

== History ==
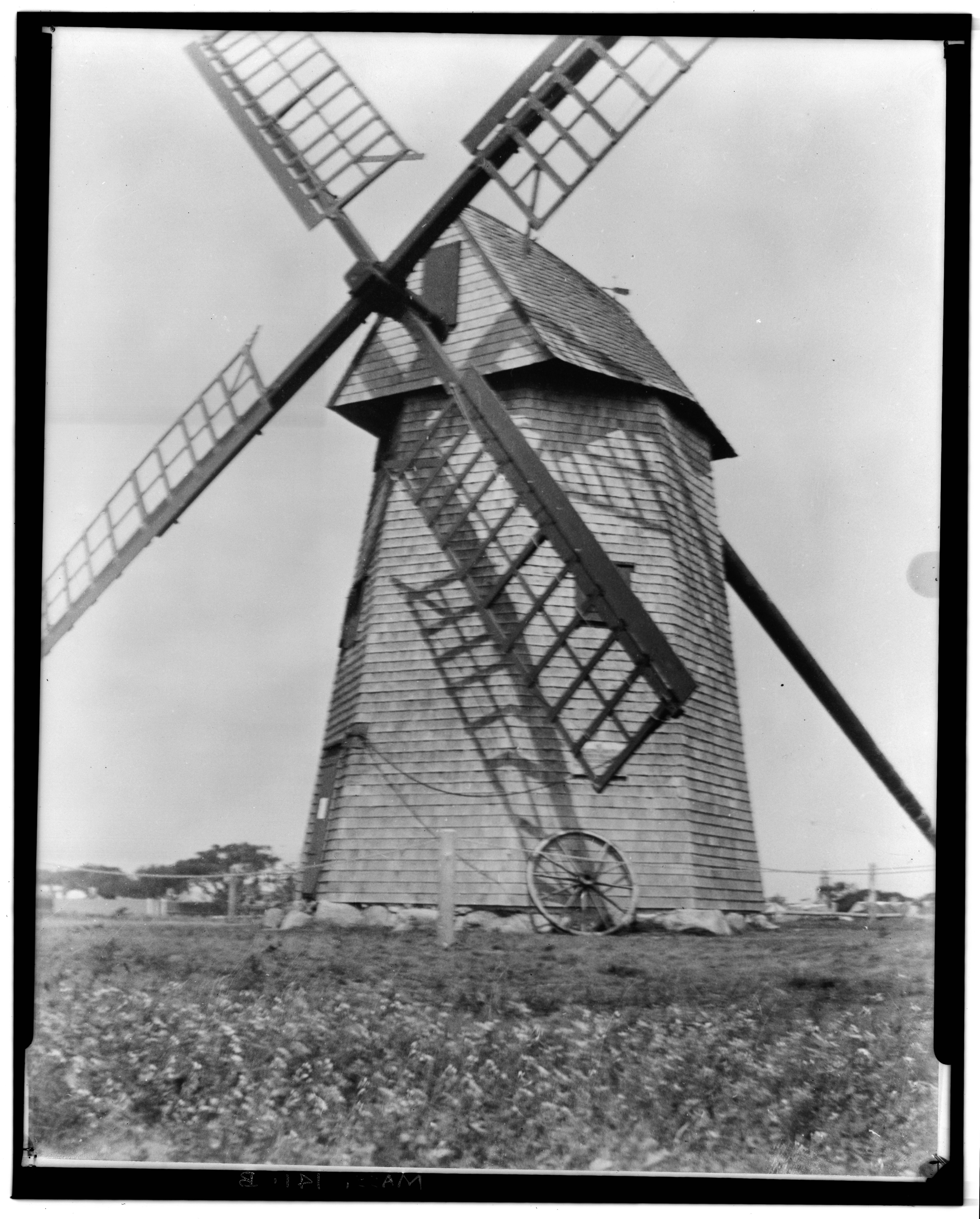
1935 photo

The Old Mill is the only survivor of four windmills that were once located along the range of hills on the west side of Nantucket Island. It is a smock type windmill built in 1746 by Nathan Wilbur, a local sailor who had spent time in Holland. Wilbur used oaken beams that had washed ashore from wrecked ships for much of the mill's framework, which is held together by wooden pins and scrap metal.

In 1828, the Old Mill was sold to Jared Gardner for twenty dollars. By then it was in deplorable condition. However, instead of dismantling it, Gardner, a carpenter, restored the mill to working condition capable of grinding corn. The mill was sold once again in 1866 to John Francis Sylvia, who operated it for many years with his assistant Peter Hoy until it fell into disuse in 1892. In 1897 Caroline French purchased the mill at an auction for $850 and donated it to the Nantucket Historical Association.

The Old Mill is 50 feet (15.24 m) high, with four vanes 30 feet (9.144 m) in length. The interior mechanism has a driving wheel at the top, connected to the blades. It has a fixed body containing machinery and a cap that turns to face the sails into the wind. Projecting from the driving wheel are wooden cogs that intersect with another set of wooden teeth in a vertical shaft, which in turn revolves the upper grindstone. A crude brake consisting of heavy oak beam attached by a rope and pulley to a box of stone weighing several hundred pounds was built to counteract the force of the wind. The box of stone can be raised or lowered to press the beam against the windmill shaft.

Inside, seasonal visitors can watch the gears as corn is ground into meal, producing about 5 bushels an hour. Documentation of the restoration of the windmill is located at the Nantucket Historical Association's Research Center.
