= Crocker Snow Jr. =

American journalist

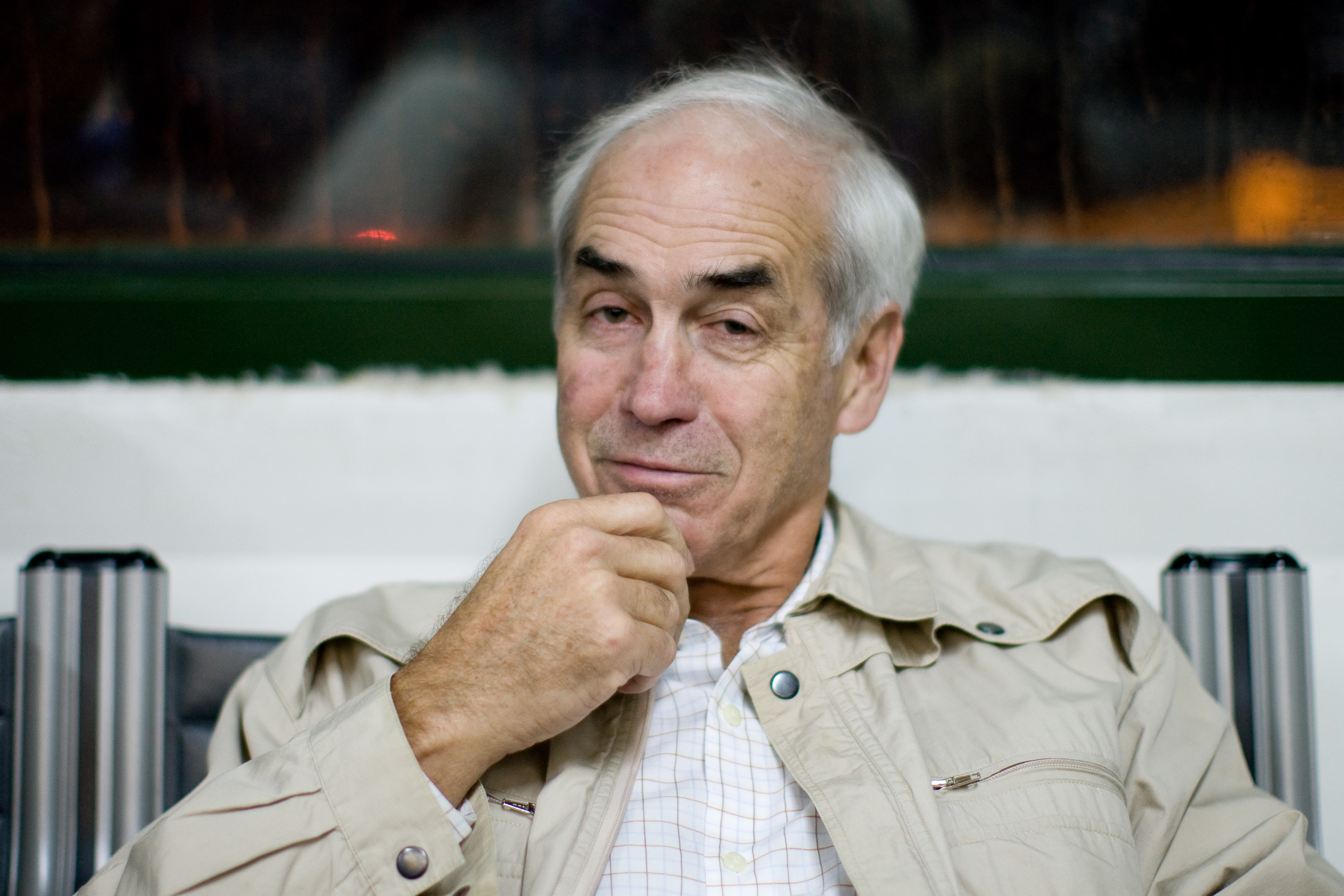
Snow in 2008

Crocker Snow Jr. (born 1940) is a former director of the Edward R. Murrow Center for Public Diplomacy at Tufts University's Fletcher School of Law and Diplomacy. He is a veteran American journalist. Snow has worked at Newsweek, WGBH public radio as a correspondent in Germany, and at the Boston Globe as chief foreign correspondent, national and foreign editor and assistant to the publisher.

== Early life ==
Snow was born in 1940 to aviator Crocker Snow Sr. and Janice Vaughan. He was raised in Ipswich, Massachusetts, and spent summers in the family-owned Muskeget Island off of Nantucket. Snow graduated cum laude from Harvard College in 1961 with an AB in general studies. He continued his education at the Fletcher School of Law and Diplomacy with an MA in international affairs.

== Career ==
In the three years between 1962 and 1965, Snow served in the U.S. Navy as an officer at sea and ashore in Sasebo, Japan. He received an honorable discharge from the Navy in 1965 when he was a Lieutenant (junior grade).

Snow's tenure at Newsweek was short. In 1965, he was their New England correspondent. That same year he took the post at WGBH where he reported from West Germany. He stayed with WGBH until 1967. It was following his stint at WGBH that Snow took on with the Boston Globe, there he worked as a political reporter when he started. At the Globe, where he would stay until 1978 he rose through the ranks quickly holding multiple positions. In 1970-71 he was the assistant managing editor, from '72 to '74 the chief foreign correspondent in Japan, Vietnam, and East Asia. From 1976 until 1978 he held two positions at the Globe, assistant to the publisher national and foreign editor,

From 1978 to 2001 Snow was president of The WorldPaper, a publication he founded. The WorldPaper appeared in 27 countries and seven-language editions, including Spanish, Japanese, Chinese, Russian, Korean and Arabic.

He founded several organizations as well including The Money Matters Institute (1996) and the Global Horizons Fund (2003).

== Honors ==
- 1968: First Edward R. Murrow Fellow at Fletcher School
- 1968: UPI Tom Phillips Award, executive producer for 8-part radio documentary On Crime.
- 1974: Major Armstrong Award runner-up for radio documentary Men Against Hitler.
