= Sankaty Head Light =

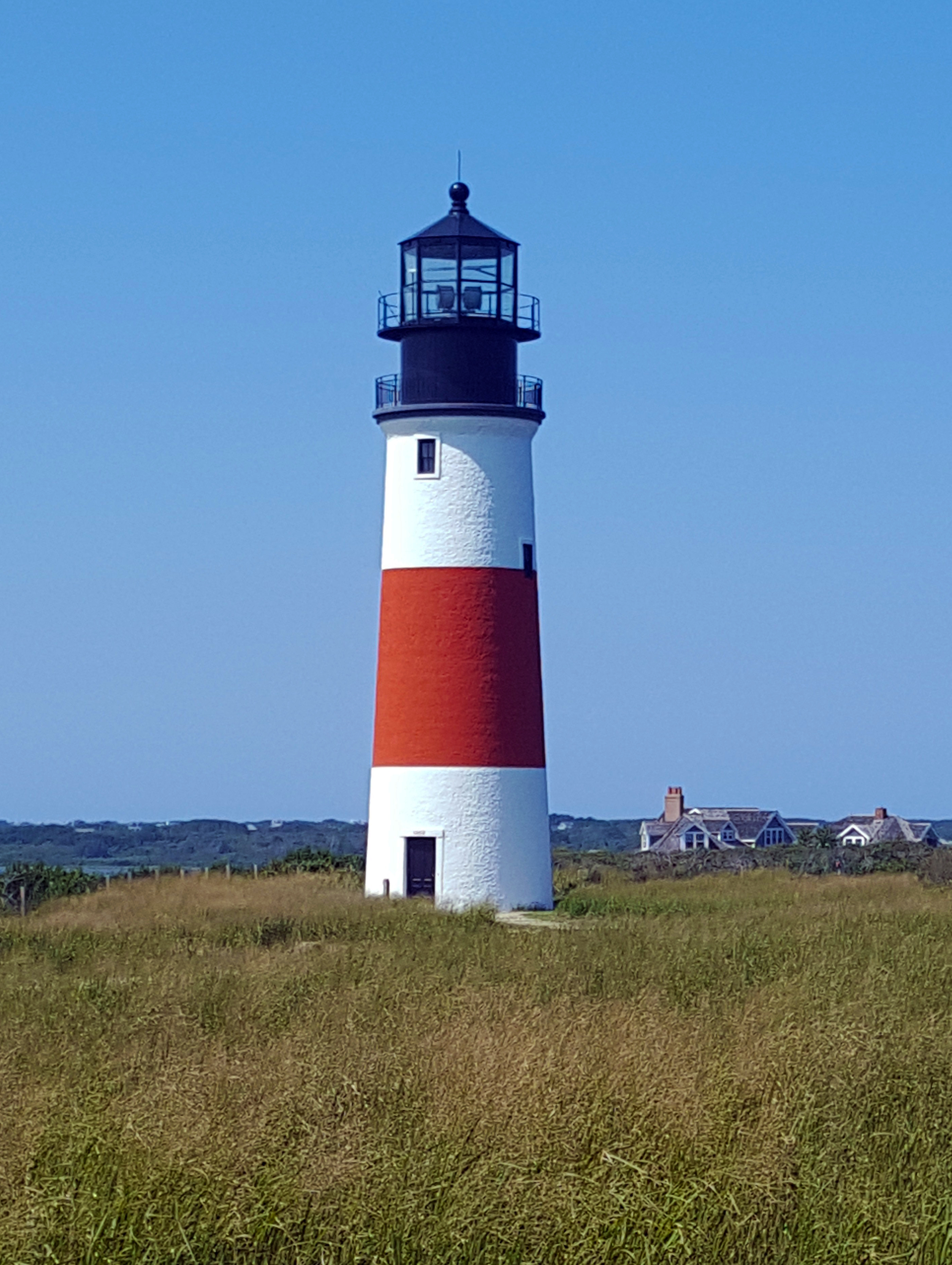
- Sankaty Head Light
- Location: Siasconset, Massachusetts
- Coordinates: 41°17′03.78″N 69°57′58.45″W

Tower
- Foundation: Brick
- Construction: Brick / Granite
- Automated: 1965
- Height: 70 feet (21 m), 158 feet (48 m) from sea level
- Shape: Cylindrical
- Markings: White with red band midway and black lantern
- Heritage: National Register of Historic Places listed place

Light
- First lit: 1850
- Focal height: 48 m (157 ft)
- Lens: Second order Fresnel lens (original); DCB-224 (current)
- Range: 24 nautical miles (44 km; 28 mi)
- Characteristic: White, flashing every 7.5 sec
- Sankaty Head Light
- U.S. National Register of Historic Places
- Location: Nantucket, Massachusetts
- NRHP reference No.: 87002028
- Added to NRHP: October 15, 1987

The Sankaty Head Light is a lighthouse located on Nantucket island. It was built in 1850, was automated in 1965, and is still in operation. It is located at the easternmost point of the island, in the village of Siasconset. It was one of the first lighthouses in the United States to receive a Fresnel lens.

== History ==
The shoals off the eastern coast of Nantucket had a long history as a hazard to navigation. The United States government decided in the 1840s that a prominent lighthouse should be erected to alert mariners to that hazard. Congress appropriated $12,000 for its construction in 1848, with additional funds totaling $8,000 in following years. The light went into service in February 1850. The tower is 60 feet (18 m) high; its lower portion is constructed of brick, and its upper part is granite. The light's turning mechanism was powered by a weight-driven brass clockwork,

A brick house was built next to the tower at the time of its construction to house the light keeper's family. In 1887 this house was torn down and a new structure was built. Renovations to the tower at the time included installation of a new lantern section, adding some 10 feet (3.0 m) to its height.

In 1933 the light was electrified, and the mechanical works to turn it were taken out of service. Its original lens was removed in 1950, and is now at the Nantucket Whaling Museum. The light was fully automated in 1965.

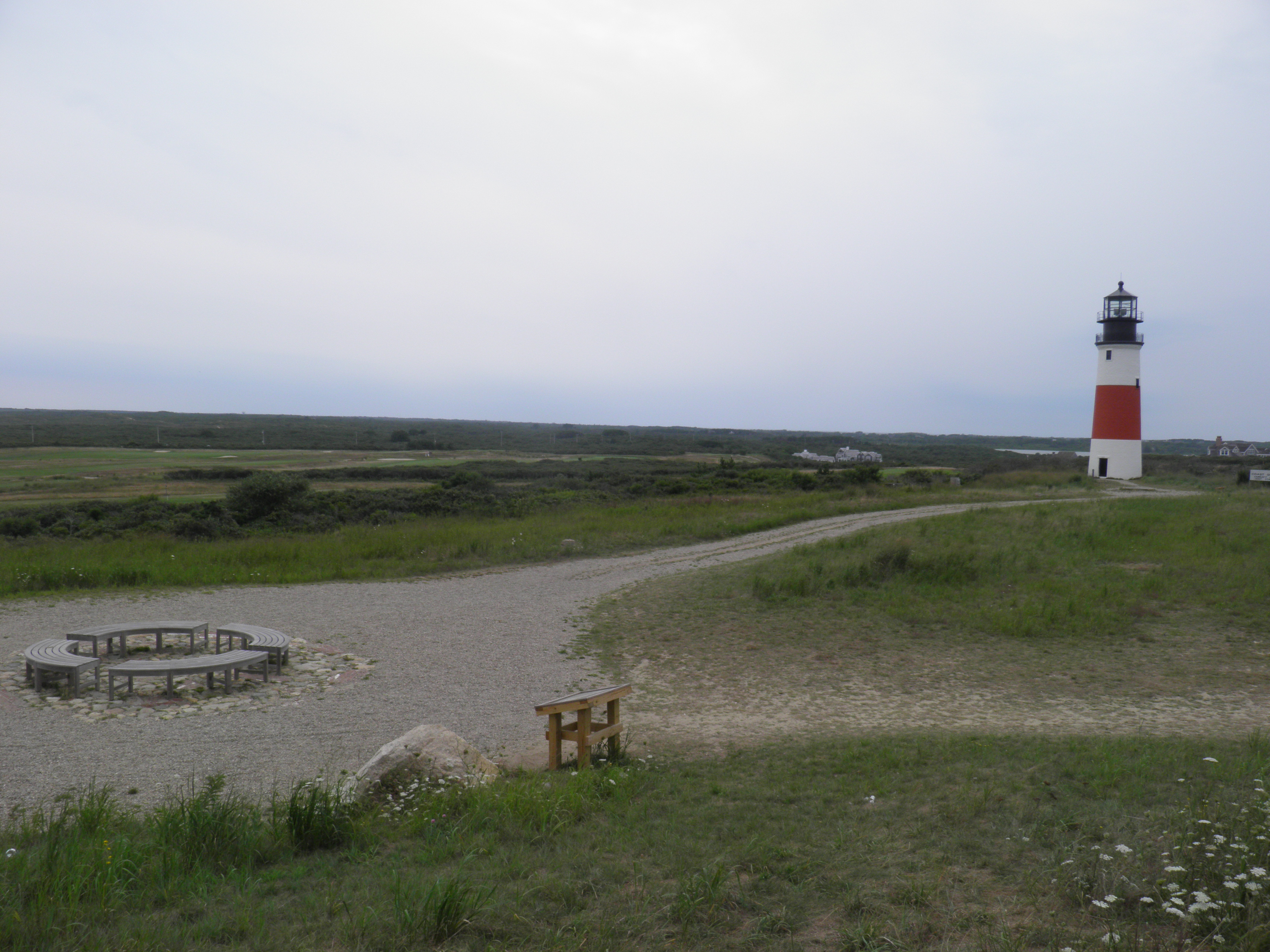
Sankaty Light at its current location. The former location is where the benches are

In 1987, the lighthouse was listed on the National Register of Historic Places as the Sankaty Head Light. The 'Sconset Trust acquired the lighthouse in 2007, and had it moved away from the eroding bluff (approximately 400 feet (120 m)) in October of that year.

== See also ==
- National Register of Historic Places listings in Nantucket County, Massachusetts
