= Dry Shoal =

Coordinates: 41°20′35.09″N 70°16′49.75″W

Dry Shoal refers to an exposed sandbar about half a mile from the northwestern end of Nantucket Island, near Muskeget Island in the U.S. state of Massachusetts. At very high tides, the Dry Shoal can be completely covered. It is a hazard to navigation. In 1898, the schooner Demozelle was stranded there.

Part of the Muskeget Island group, Dry Shoal was once larger. Now separated from Muskeget by a stretch of fairly shallow water, it is accessible by kayakers, and it is possible to walk there from Muskeget, but only at moon neap tide.

From Dry Shoal, one can see the eastern shore of Chappaquiddick Island (from Wasque Point to Cape Poge). One may also see Great Point, on the northern tip of Nantucket Island. Dry Shoal, which has no permanent human population and no structures, is part of Nantucket County, Massachusetts.

== Fauna ==
It is known for its seal-nesting sites. In 1898, a small colony of terns nestered at Dry Shoal despite its lack of vegetation; unfortunately their hundred or so eggs were swept away by the tides. John C. Phillips wrote in The Sands of Muskeget in 1931: "Last year this high sand bar was closely packed with Geese, Black Ducks, and Gulls as we sailed by, a noble sight, showing how valuable even a few acres of resting area can be if the same be properly chosen." Other birds sighted there have included loons, grebes, alcids, and brant.
