= Nantucket Whaling Museum =

Museum in Nantucket, Massachusetts, United States

The Nantucket Whaling Museum
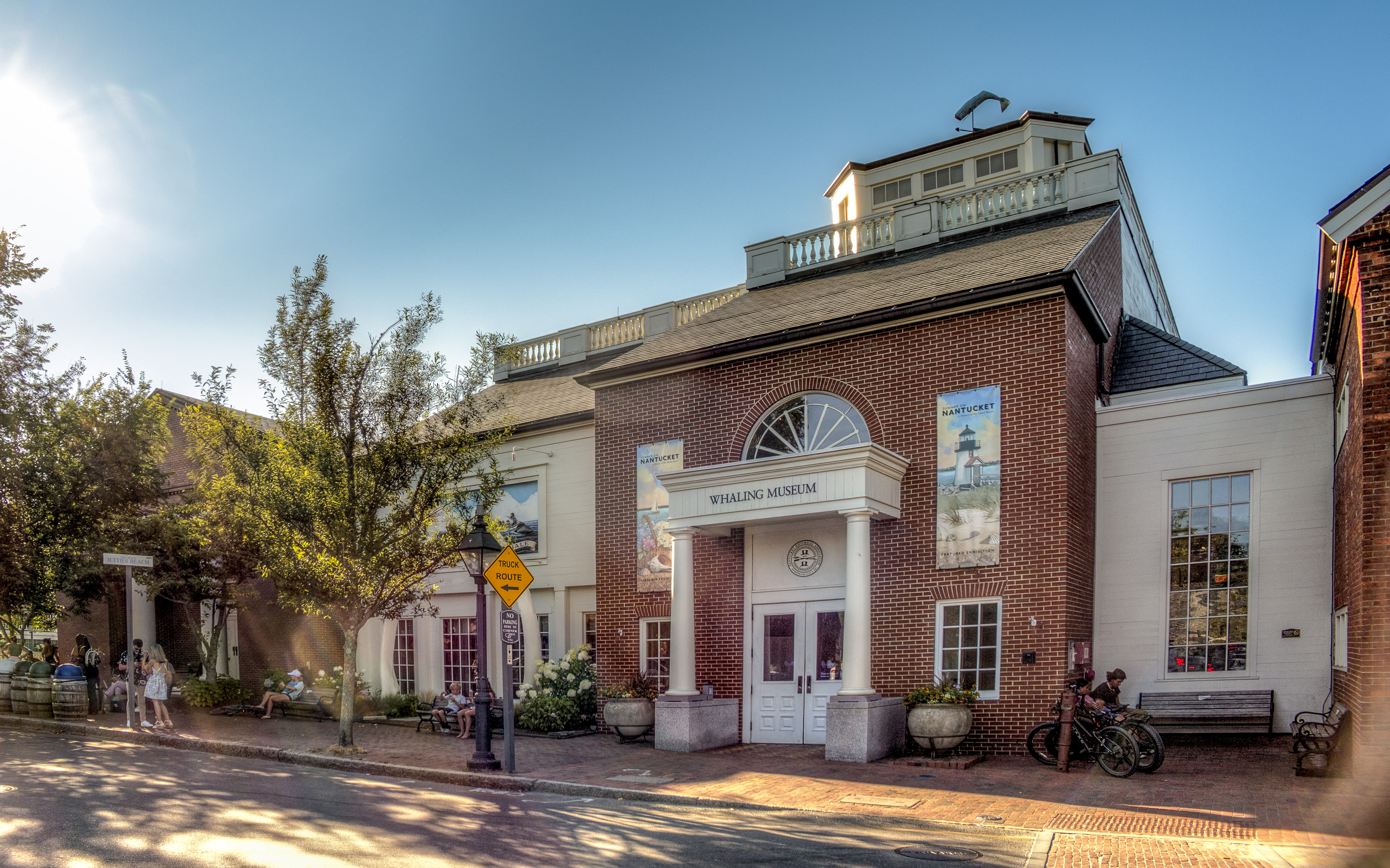
- Established: 1930
- Location: Nantucket, Massachusetts
- Coordinates: 41.285524°N 70.098941°W
- Type: Museum
- Website: nha.org/visit/museums-and-tours/whaling-museum

Nantucket Whaling Museum

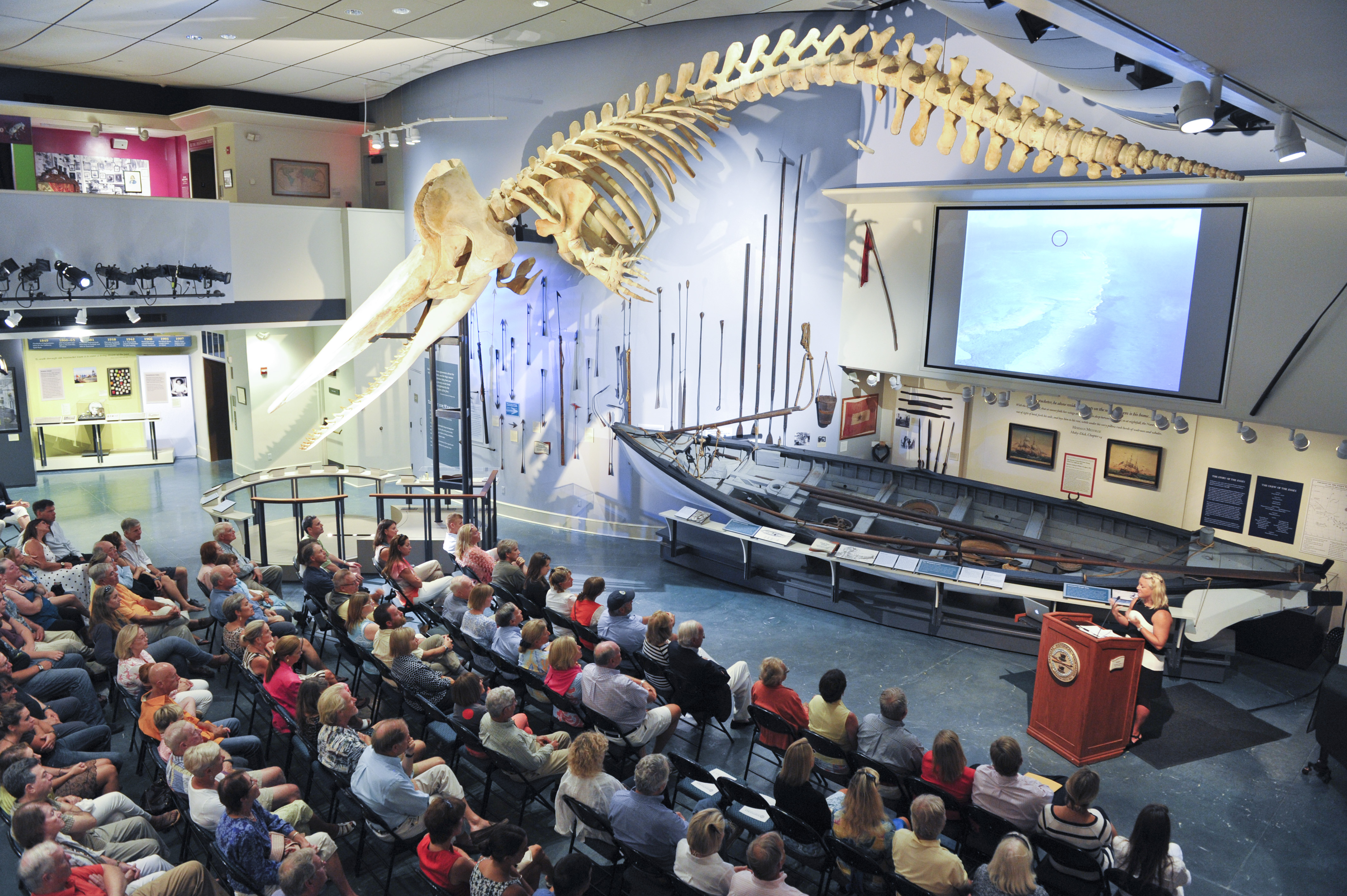
Auditorium

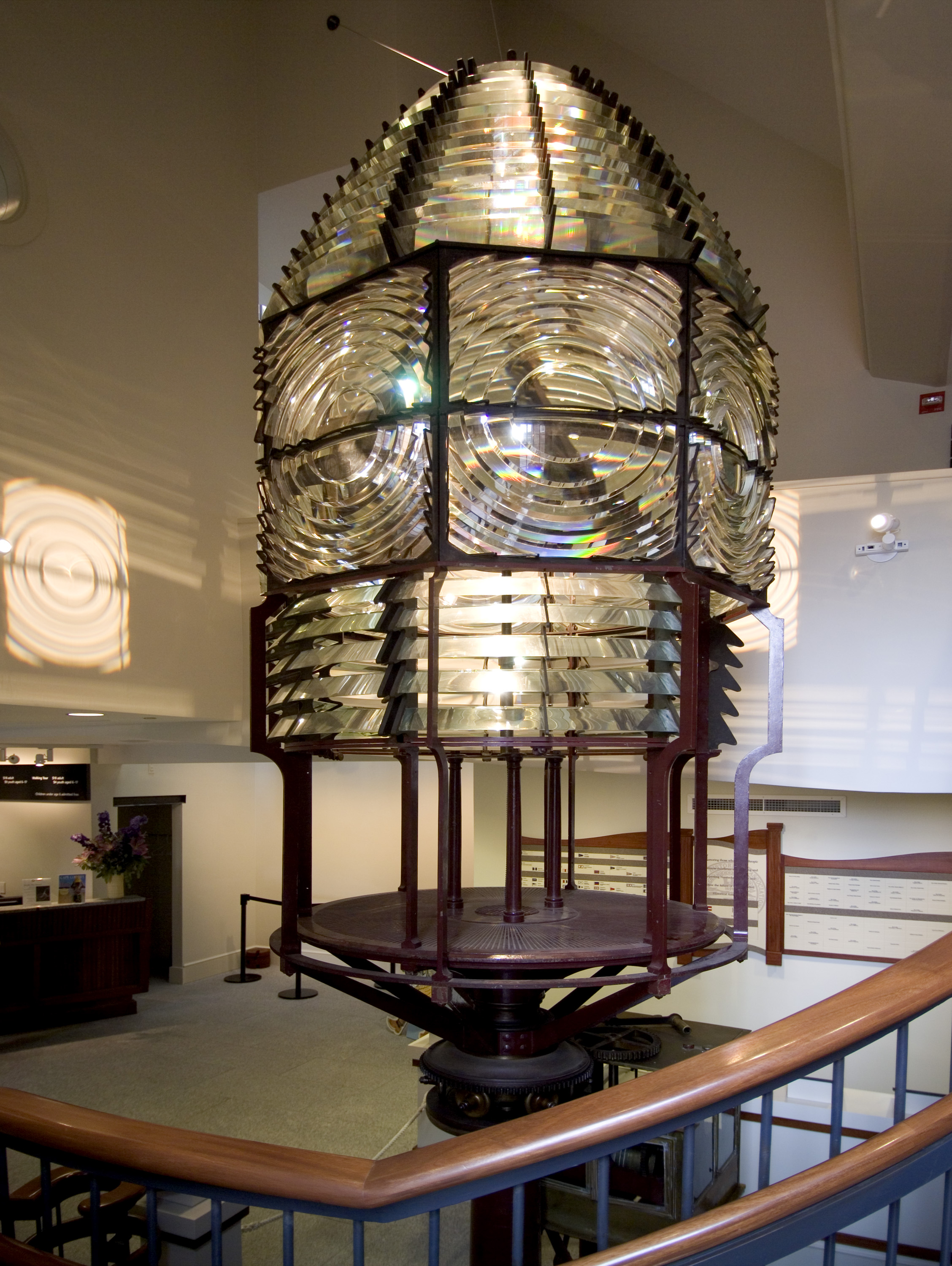
1849 Fresnel Lens used in Sankaty Head Lighthouse

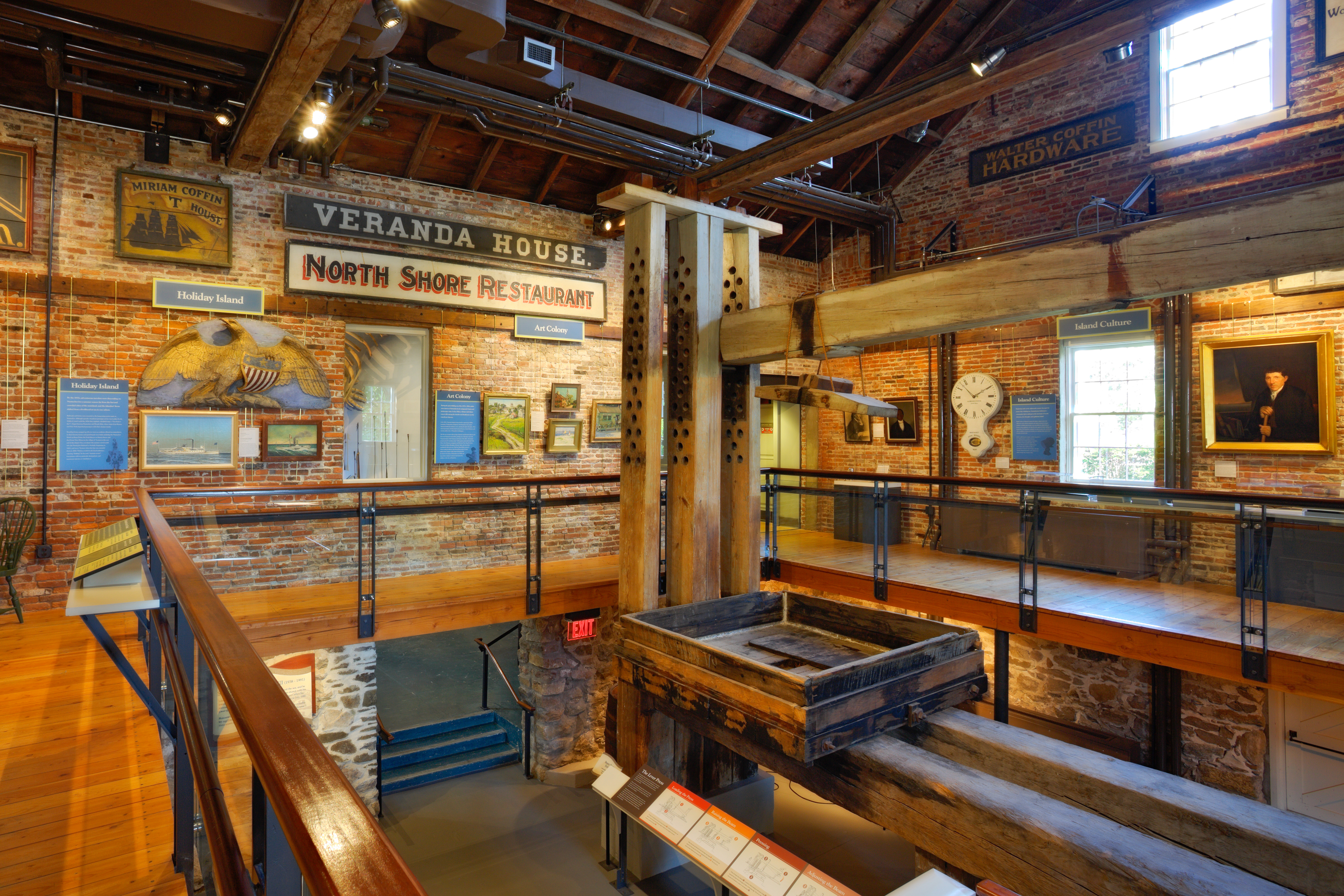
1847 Hadwen & Barney Oil and Candle Factory

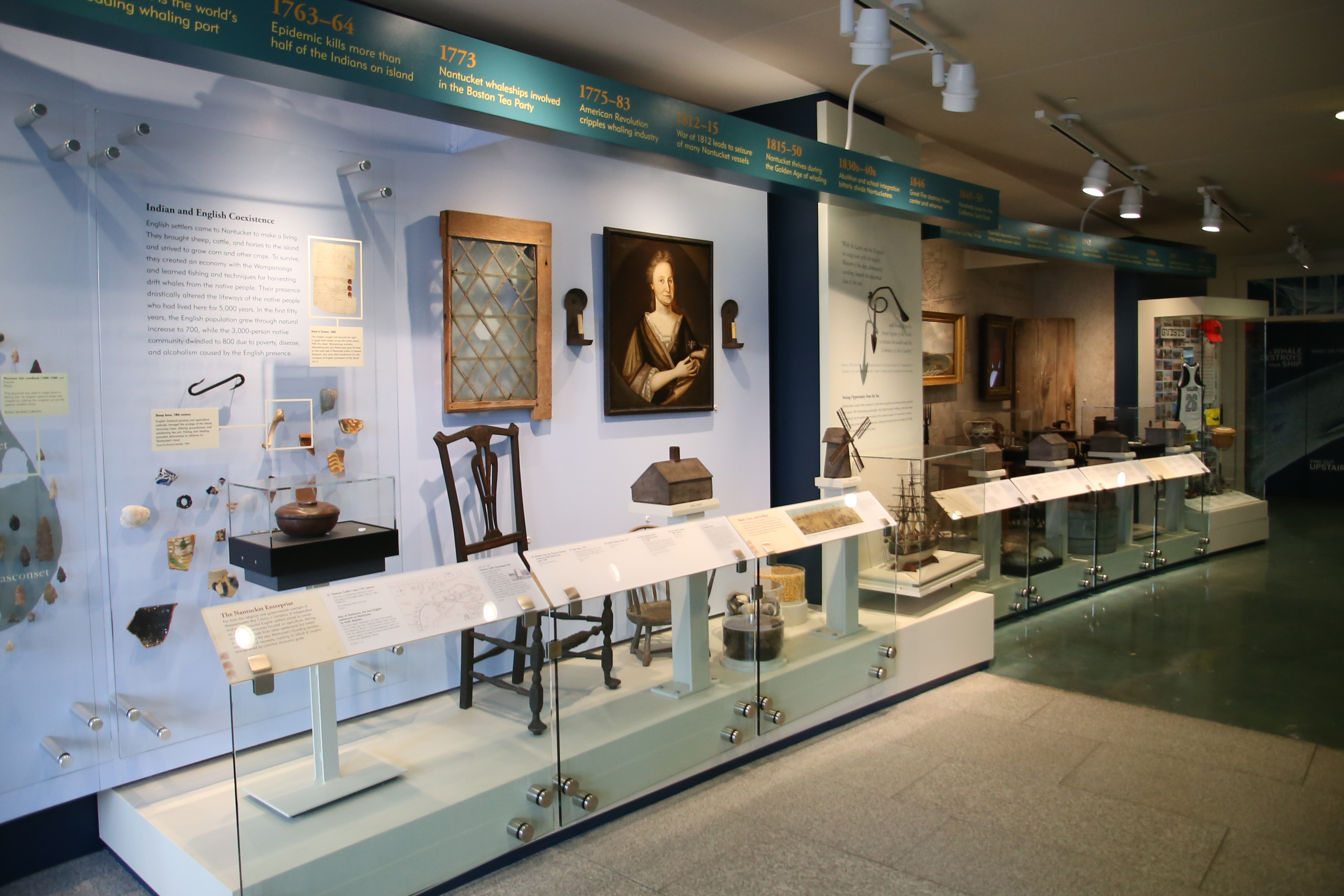
Nantucket timeline display

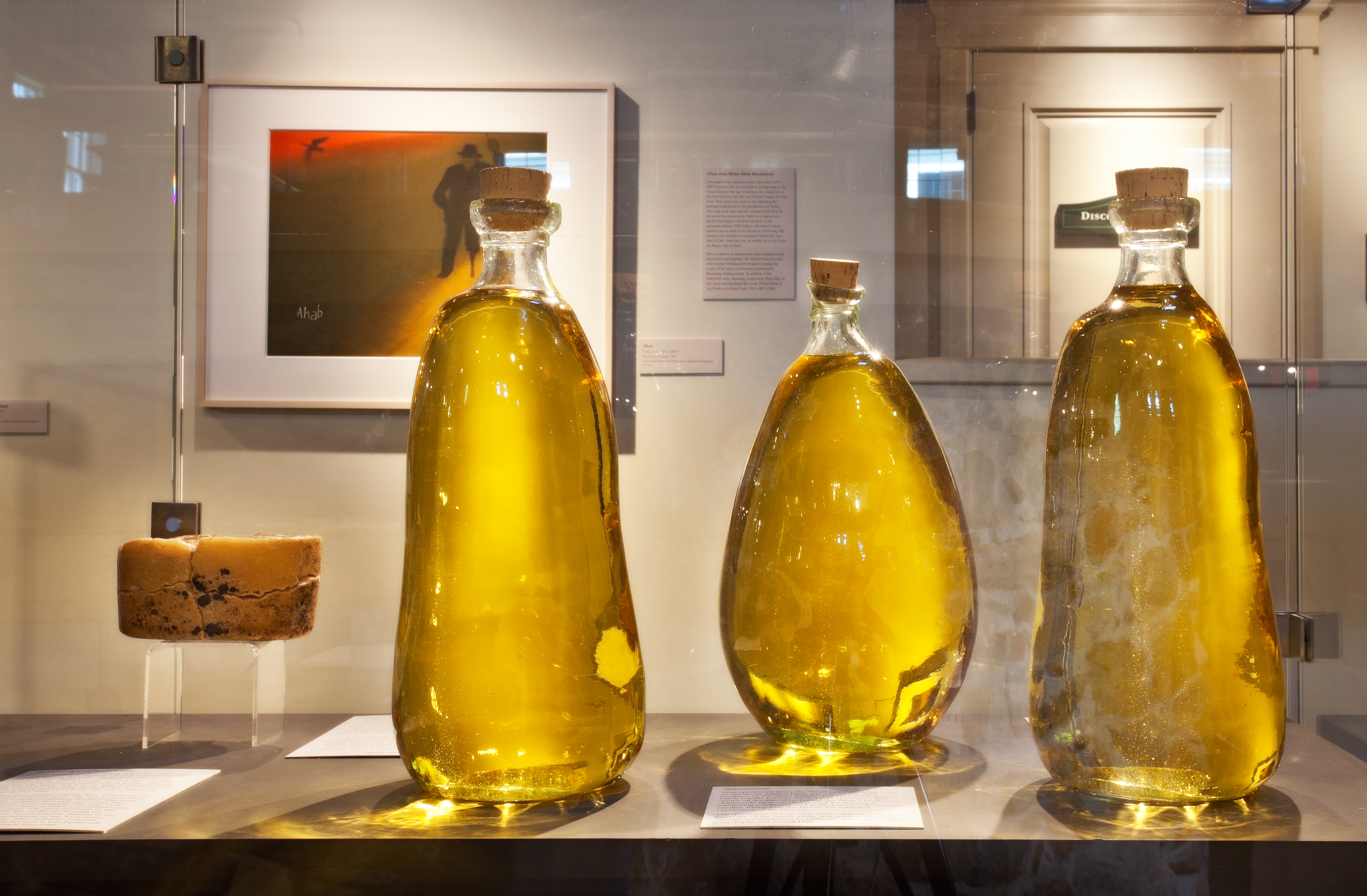
Whale oil

The Nantucket Whaling Museum is a museum located in Nantucket, Massachusetts, United States. It is run by the Nantucket Historical Association. The Whaling Museum is the flagship site of the Nantucket Historical Association’s fleet of properties.

Restored in 2005, the Nantucket Whaling Museum has an expanded exhibit and program space that connects the 1847 Hadwen & Barney Oil and Candle Factory and the 1971 Peter Foulger Museum. The new structure includes the Gosnell Hall Whale Hunt Gallery, where a 46 foot (14 meter) long sperm whale skeleton is suspended from the ceiling. The Hadwen & Barney Oil and Candle Factory, featuring the massive lever press, is interpreted as an industrial site where the complicated process of refining oil and making spermaceti candles is explained, along with the other Nantucket industries that arose from the whaling era. Eleven galleries and exhibit spaces featuring artifacts and art pertaining to Nantucket life, art, and ideas are on display.

In 2008, the Whaling Museum received accreditation from the American Association of Museums. The museum was reaccredited in 2017.

== History ==
William Hadwen and Nathaniel Barney were partners in a whale-oil manufacturing firm on the island in the mid-19th century, Hadwen & Barney. In 1848, they purchased the oil and candle factory building on Broad Street at the head of New North Wharf (now Steamboat Wharf) built by Richard Mitchell & Sons in 1847, a year after the Great Fire swept through the area. The Greek Revival-style industrial building (similar to the Thomas Macy Warehouse on Straight Wharf) was originally the core of a complex of buildings devoted to oil processing and candle manufacturing, supplying oil for street lamps in London and Paris and lighthouses along the Atlantic coast of the United States.

After the local whaling industry failed, the last whaling ship sailed from Nantucket in 1869, the building was used as a warehouse, and much later as an antiques shop. In 1929, it was purchased by the Nantucket Historical Association to house a collection of whaling artifacts donated by Edward F. Sanderson, a Congregational minister. The Whaling Museum opened in the Hadwen & Barney Oil and Candle Factory in 1930, with Sanderson’s collection of whaling implements and other material relating to the industry displayed in the refinery building. Harpoons, lances, blubber hooks, cutting spades, and a whaleboat fitted out for action were enlivened with the whaling tableaux and commentary of “custodian” George Grant.

The collections of the NHA continued to expand in the twentieth century. While the Whaling Museum featured the industry that made Nantucket an internationally recognized name in the eighteenth and nineteenth centuries, the Fair Street Museum showcased artifacts that told the story of island life, and the NHA’s house museums interpreted domestic life during successive historical eras. Space to preserve and exhibit the relics of an earlier age was always at a premium, but Admiral William Mayhew Folger, a descendant of early settler Peter Foulger, left a bequest to the NHA in 1929 that honored his ancestor. He specifically required the NHA to use the funds from his bequest to construct a building similar to the Coffin School, a Greek Revival-style brick building built on Winter Street in 1852 with funds donated by Sir Isaac Coffin, a British admiral descended from Tristram Coffin. Admiral Folger’s gift was received in 1968, after the death of his last surviving beneficiary, and following his wishes, the building at the corner of Broad and North Water streets was completed in 1971, providing new exhibit halls, a library room, office space, and more room to store collections.

The NHA library and artifact collections were housed in their own dedicated buildings in the late twentieth and early twenty-first centuries, freeing up the Broad Street compound for improvement. A new museum was designed, incorporating the 1847 Hadwen & Barney Oil and Candle Factory and the 1971 Peter Foulger Museum on the opposite corner of the block as part of a new site that bridged the two buildings with exhibit and program space, including Gosnell Hall, where a forty-foot-long sperm-whale skeleton is suspended from the ceiling. The Hadwen & Barney Oil and Candle Factory, featuring the massive lever-press, is interpreted as an industrial site where the complicated process of refining oil and making spermaceti candles is explained. New exhibition spaces extend above and around Gosnell Hall, including a scrimshaw and decorative arts gallery and galleries for changing exhibits about Nantucket life, arts, and ideas.

== See also ==
- List of maritime museums in the United States
