= Muskeget Island =

Island in Nantucket County, Massachusetts, United States

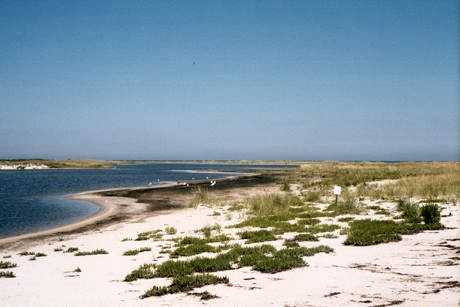
- Muskeget Island

- Location within Massachusetts
- Location: Nantucket, Massachusetts, United States
- Coordinates: 41°20′7″N 70°18′15″W
- Elevation: 14 ft (4.3 m)

Muskeget Island (/mʌsˈkiɡɪt/ mus-KEE-git) is a low, sandy island to the west of Tuckernuck Island and Nantucket, in the town of Nantucket, Massachusetts, United States.

== Geography ==
Muskeget Island is part of the terminal moraine marking the maximum extent of the last glacial ice sheet to reach the northeastern coast. It has an area of 244 acres (99 hectares); a saltwater lagoon covers 30 acres (12 hectares) of this area. The Muskeget Island group contains Dry Shoal, Skiff Island, Tombolo Point, and Adams Island. Two-thirds of the island is owned by former reporter Crocker Snow Jr., with the rest owned by the town of Nantucket. There are currently two unoccupied shacks on the island, both of which are remnants of old structures, and a small landing strip.

Muskeget has a high elevation of fourteen feet. Its northern shore is mostly sand dunes, while its southern shore is mainly marshes. A sandy point protects and engulfs the lagoon.

== History ==
The island was part of Dukes County until 1887 when it was transferred to and annexed by Nantucket County. Shortly after, land on the island was purchased to form the Muskeget Island Club for waterfowl hunting, and several buildings were constructed. Around 1950, half of the island, along with the 8 buildings standing at that time, was purchased by a partnership led by aviator Crocker Snow Sr. (as erosion has changed the shape of that island, that land currently encompasses 2/3 of the island). Snow, who built the Muskeget Island Airport there with his son Crocker Snow Jr., became full owner of the property after the other two partners died. Snow Jr. wrote several books on the island and its ecology and pushed to have it designated as a National Natural Landmark by the National Park Service in April 1980, and having a conservation restriction placed on the island in 2009.

== Ecology ==
Southern Muskeget island is made up mostly of marshes and grassland.

Muskeget is the southernmost breeding place of grey seals, the most common mammal on the island, and Muskeget and Monomoy islands are the primary seal colonies off the New England coast. In 2008, more than 2,000 pups were born on Muskeget. With this large seal population, the waters surrounding Muskeget are an important feeding area for great white sharks.

The island is also home to an endemic species of rodent known as the Muskeget vole or beach vole, one of two terrestrial mammal species on the island. This vole feeds on beach grass stalks, leaves and seeds, and insect adults and larvae. Their predators include domestic cats (which were extirpated from the island some time in the late 1800s), short-eared owls, and northern harriers. The IUCN has classified the beach vole as vulnerable.

Endangered species of pirate spiders, piping plovers, roseate terns and arctic terns can also be found on the island.

== Access ==
Muskeget is inaccessible to most boats because of shoals and sandbars. Kayaking there can be very dangerous because of rip currents, swells, and whirlpools. Specialized boats designed to navigate the difficult waters around the Island depart from Nantucket Harbor.

Muskeget Island Airport, is a small privately owned turf landing strip 1100' in length x 25' in width on the island. It is said to be accessible to STOL aircraft, but has been designated by the FAA as being for emergency use only.
