= Madaket Ditch =

Canal in Nantucket, Massachusetts, US

Coordinates: 41°15′40″N 70°11′28″W

The Madaket Ditch, formerly spelled as Maddequet Ditch, is a canal connecting Long Pond to Madaket Harbor on the western edge of Nantucket, Massachusetts.

The ditch was first dug circa 1665 by English settlers and Native Americans as the first public works project on Nantucket. It runs roughly southwest for about 1 mile and was cut as freshwater channels running through freshwater cattail marsh and salt marsh, in order to create more meadow and catch fish running through it in a weir. Fish runs have historically included perch, herring, smelt, and eels. In the early 20th century, a large dip net, about four feet in diameter and eight feet long, subconical in shape, was used instead of a weir to scoop up fish.

Today the ditch still exists at Second Bridge, with depths between two and four feet. As it is tidal, there is little variation in water level at the pond's end.
