= Tuckernuck Island =

Island in the town and former whaling port of Nantucket, Massachusetts

Coordinates: 41°18′8″N 70°15′26″W

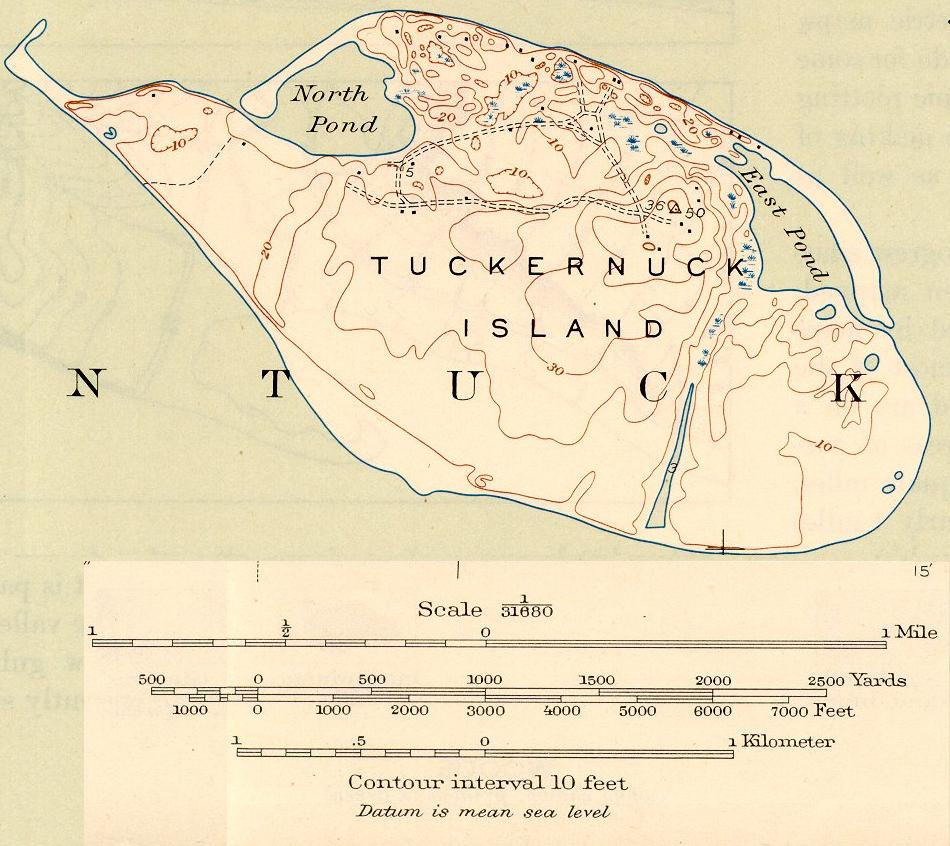
1944 USGS 7.5 Minute Series

Tuckernuck is an island in the town and former whaling port of Nantucket, Massachusetts, west of Nantucket Island and east of Muskeget Island. Its name allegedly means "a loaf of bread". The island has an area of about 900 acres (360 hectares). The highest point is about 50 feet (15 m).

== Settlement ==
The island is privately owned by its summer residents. Approximately 35 houses have been built on Tuckernuck; the oldest home on the island was built in the mid-18th century. The island has no paved roads or public utilities. Electricity is generated by gasoline-powered generators and solar panels. Water comes from several different wells on the island and water heaters are generally gasoline-powered, as are the stoves. The island has some cars, but most of the motorized transportation is provided by golf carts.

== Geology ==
Tuckernuck was originally formed by the terminal moraine of the last glacial episode (Wisconsin glaciation). It still retains remnants of the moraine as low hills, but the southern half of the island consists of outwash plains (sandur) characterized by coastal heathland, a globally restricted and endangered plant community.

== Flora and fauna ==
Coastal heathland occurs only in the Northeast United States, from Long Island, NY, to Cape Cod, MA. Dominant species include little bluestem (Schizachyrium scoparium), bearberry (Arctostaphylos uva-ursi), and low ericaceous shrubs (Family: Ericaceae). There are extensive areas of scrub oak (Quercus ilicifolia) vegetation of up to 15 feet (4.6 m) in height, along with pitch pine (Pinus rigida), black huckleberry (Gaylussacia baccata) and sweet pepperbush (Clethra alnifolia). Red maple (Acer rubrum) and black gum (Nyssa sylvatica) trees occur in kettlehole swamps. Other plants include American beachgrass (Ammophila breviligulata), seaside goldenrod (Solidago sempervirens), poison ivy (Toxicodendron radicans), bayberry (Myrica pensylvanica), beach plum (Prunus maritima), saltspray rose (Rosa rugosa) and other shrubs on the stabilized dunes. There are a few small freshwater marshes and a salt marsh dominated by cordgrass (Spartina alterniflora).

The largest concentration of Long-tailed Duck (Clangula hyemalis) in the western Atlantic occurs nearby (counts of over 150,000 have been recorded), along with thousands of common eiders (Somateria mollissima) and three species of scoter (Melanitta spp.). In late summer a thousand or more roseate terns (Sterna dougallii), a U.S. endangered species, feed near here in preparation for their southward migration. Extensive sandspits on Tuckernuck are favored haul-out points for large numbers of harbor and gray seals (Phoca vitulina and Halichoerus grypus, respectively). The island also supports many other state and federally rare species, including Nantucket shadbush (Amelanchier nantucketensis), a candidate species for listing under the Endangered Species Act; several pairs of short-eared owl (Asio flammeus); piping plover (Charadrius melodus), a U.S. threatened species; least tern (Sterna antillarum); northern harrier (Circus cyaneus) and common tern (Sterna hirundo).

== Public access ==
The southeast end of the island has a grass airstrip, Tuckernuck Airport, which is seldom used.

== Popular culture ==
Tuckernuck is one of the settings for Death on Tuckernuck, a book in the series of Merry Folger mystery novels by Francine Mathews.
