= Coffin (surname) =

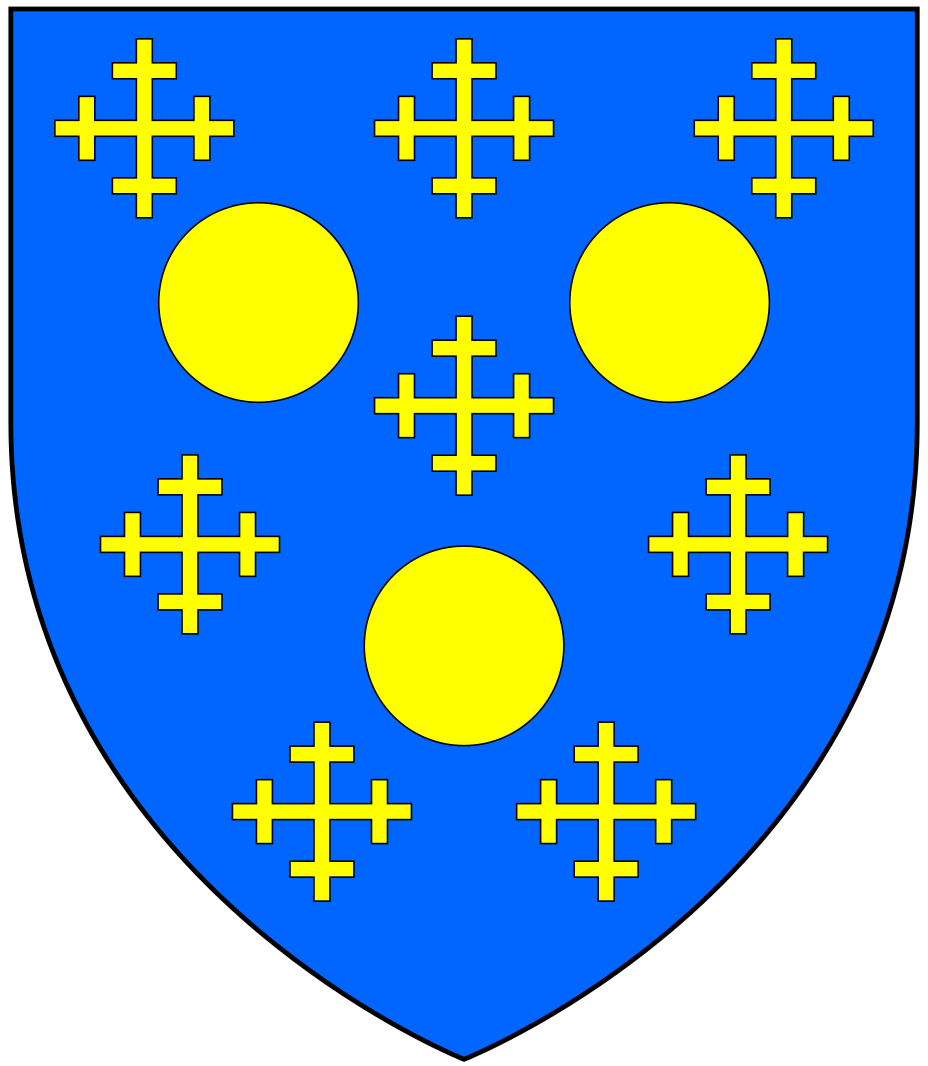
- Arms of Coffin of Portledge, Alwington, Devon: Azure, three bezants between eight crosses crosslet or
- Current region: South West England; New England; Eastern Canada New Zealand Australia
- Earlier spellings: Coffyn
- Origin: Portledge Manor, Devon, England
- Traditions: Christianity

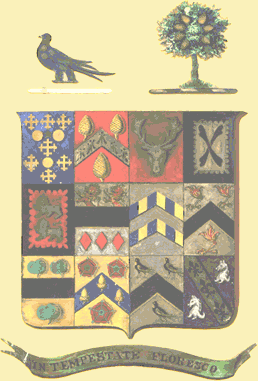
Pine-Coffin quartered arms

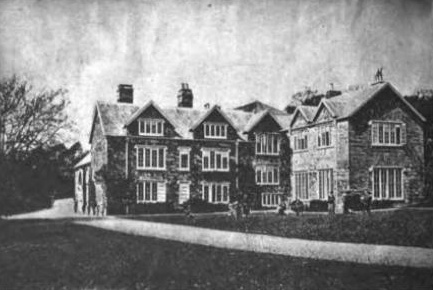
Portledge manor

The House of Coffin is an ancient English family of Norman Origin, which originated in Devonshire. The family lineage goes back to Sir Richard Coffin, a knight who accompanied William the Conqueror from Normandy to England in 1066, who was assigned the manor of Alwington (Portledge manor) in Devonshire. The Coffins held a number of manors but this was the most notable of all. The manor was held within the family for over nine centuries. With the marriage of Edward Pyne, of Eastdown, with Dorothy Coffin of Portledge Manor in 1672, the named ownership of the manor shifted officially to the Pine-Coffin family. Notable Coffins of the 15th-16th century include Richard Coffin (1456–1523) of Alwington who was a Sheriff of Devon.

The progenitor of most of the American Coffins was Tristram Coffin, a Royalist, who came to Massachusetts with his wife Dionis Stevens, from the Coffin family farm at Brixton, Devonshire in 1642. He was one of the original proprietors of Nantucket.

Tristram and Dionis Coffin's descendants include some of the Boston Brahmin, a class of wealthy, educated, elite members of Boston society in the 19th century. Many American Coffins are or were Quakers. Many descendants initially settled at seaports on the eastern coast of the United States and in Canada. A large number of families were active in trade through the triangle trade, primarily for the exchange of goods like of whale oil and other raw materials. They built and owned whaling vessels, commanded the vessels as captains or masters, or worked on the crews. Some became experts in international trade, establishing business relationships around the world with their descendants eventually settling in far off countries such as Australia and New Zealand.

Many American Coffins became Quakers who adopted anti-slavery principles and in 1778, prohibited members of the Friends Society from being enslavers. Some of the Coffins who are known for their work as abolitionists include Joshua Coffin, Lucretia Coffin Mott, Martha Coffin Wright, Levi and Catherine (White) Coffin Jr., Vestal Coffin, and Addison Coffin. Levi Coffin Jr, was an American Quaker, Republican, abolitionist, farmer, businessman and humanitarian. An active leader of the Underground Railroad in Indiana and Ohio, some unofficially called Coffin the "President of the Underground Railroad", estimating that three thousand fugitive slaves passed through his care.

== List of persons with the surname Coffin ==
- Alexander J. Coffin (1794–1868), New York politician
- Alfred Oscar Coffin (1861–1933), African-American professor of mathematics and Romance language, first African American to obtain a PhD in biology
- Alison Coffin (born 1970), Canadian politician
- Bill Coffin, American writer of novels and role-playing games
- C. Hayden Coffin, English actor
- C. L. Coffin, American engineer and inventor of the arc welding process using a metal electrode
- Charles Coffin (disambiguation), several people
- Clifford Coffin, English recipient of the Victoria Cross
- Clifford Coffin, British photographer
- Dave Coffin, author of the dcraw image processing program
- David Coffin, American folk musician
- Edmund Coffin, American saddle maker and equestrian
- Edward Coffin, English Jesuit
- Frank M. Coffin, politician and jurist from the U.S. state of Maine
- Frank Trenholm Coffyn (1878–1960), American aviation pioneer
- Frederick Coffin, American film actor, singer, songwriter and musician
- George Coffin (1903–1994), American bridge player
- Howard A. Coffin (1877–1956), American politician
- Howard E. Coffin (1873–1937), American automobile engineer and founder of Hudson Motors
- Henry Sloane Coffin, American theologian
- Isaac Coffin, British East India Company Army officer
- Sir Isaac Coffin, 1st Baronet, Royal Navy officer
- James Henry Coffin, American mathematician and meteorologist
- Jeff Coffin (born 1965), American saxophonist
- John Coffin (judge) (c. 1751–1838), army officer, judge and politician in New Brunswick
- John Coffin (scientist), American virologist
- Joshua Coffin, American abolitionist
- Levi Coffin Jr. (1798–1877), American Quaker, educator and abolitionist
- Lolita Coffin Van Rensselaer (1875–1947), American clubwoman
- Lucretia Mott, née Coffin, American antislavery and women's rights advocate
- Marian Cruger Coffin, American landscape architect
- Martha Coffin Wright (1806–1875), American feminist and abolitionist
- Micajah Coffin, American mariner, trader in the whaling industry and politician
- Nathaniel Coffin (politician) (1766–1846), loyalist and Canadian politician
- Nathaniel Coffin (1744–1826), physician
- Nurhayati Srihardini Siti Nukatin Coffin (1936–2018), Indonesian novelist and feminist
- Owen Coffin (1802–1821), a teenager on the whaler Essex who was cannibalized
- Peleg Coffin Jr. (1756–1805), American financier, insurer and politician
- Peter Coffin (artist) (born 1972), American artist
- Peter Coffin (bishop), Canadian Anglican Bishop of Ottawa from 1999 to 2007
- Pierre Coffin (born 1967), French film director
- Reuben Clare Coffin, American Geologist
- Richard Coffin (1456–1523), sheriff of Devon in 1511
- Robert Aston Coffin, English priest
- Robert P. T. Coffin, American writer and poet
- Selden Jennings Coffin, American professor of mathematics and astronomy
- Shannen W. Coffin, U.S. lawyer
- Timothy R. Coffin, U.S. Army General
- Thomas Coffin (disambiguation), several people
- Tris Coffin (1909–1990), American actor
- Tristram Coffin (disambiguation), several people
- Tristram Potter Coffin (1922-2012), scholar, educator, and author
- Walter Coffin, Welsh Member of Parliament and coal owner
- Wesley H. Coffyn (1878–1946), Canadian politician
- Wilbert Coffin, Canadian executed for murder in 1956
- William Anderson Coffin, American landscape and figure painter
- William Haskell Coffin, American artist, figure painter
- William Sloane Coffin, American Christian clergyman and peace activist
- William Sloane Coffin Sr., American businessman, president of the board of trustees of the Metropolitan Museum of Art, founder of the Hearth and Home Corporation
- Zenas Coffin, one of the most successful of Nantucket's eighteenth-century whaling merchants and triangle traders

== In fiction ==
- Adam Coffin, villain in the 1977 film The Deep, based on the novel by Peter Benchley
- Benjamin Coffin III, landlord in Jonathan Larson's musical Rent
- Coffin Family, cursed family in the novel Coffins by Rodman Philbrick
- Doctor Coffin: actor Del Manning fakes his death to operate a series of Hollywood mortuaries while fighting crime at night as Doctor Coffin. Written by Perley Poore Sheehan, the stories were originally published in the pulp magazine Thrilling Detective from 1932 to 1933.
- Enoch Coffin, title character of the Lovecraftian fiction anthology Encounters with Enoch Coffin, by W. H. Pugmire and Jeffrey Thomas. Enoch is a painter/sculptor who seeks out the supernatural as inspiration for his art.
- Flower Child Coffin, the title character in the 1973 blaxploitation film, Coffy, starring Pam Grier
- Frank Coffin, detective in the mystery novel series by Jon Loomis
- Frank Trenholm Coffyn, a real-life aviator trained by the Wright Brothers, appears as a character in Jack Finney's novel From Time to Time.
- Ghost of Dr. Coffin, villain in the Scooby-Doo/Dynomutt Hour episode The Harum Scarum Sanitarium. The "ghost" is revealed to be Officer Oldfield.
- Joe Coffin, mobster/hitman turned vampire hunter in the Joe Coffin series by Ken Preston
- John Coffin, detective in the mystery novel series by Gwendoline Butler
- Jonathan Coffin, "Nonno" in Tennessee Williams' play The Night of the Iguana
- M. T. Coffin, pseudonym for various authors of the Spinetinglers series of horror novels for middle-grade children
- Mark Coffin, title character of the political novel Mark Coffin, U.S.S. by Pulitzer Prize winning author Allen Drury
- Mistress Coffin, murder victim in the novel The Strange Death of Mistress Coffin by Robert Begiebing. Set in New England in 1648, it is apparently based on an actual unsolved murder from that period.
- Peter Coffin, proprietor of "The Spouter Inn" in Herman Melville's novel Moby-Dick
- Peter Coffin, investigator of a grisly crime scene in the mystery novel The Search for My Great Uncle's Head by Jonathan Latimer
- Principal Coffin, character in the Canadian animated series Stickin' Around whom the students imagine to be a vampire
- Ray and Steve Coffin, father and son characters in Marvel's Micronauts comic book series; both men assume the persona of Captain Universe.
- Robert Coffin, adventurer and ship captain in the novel Maori by Alan Dean Foster

== See also ==
- Coffin (whaling family)
- Coffin v. United States
- Portledge Manor
