= Zenas Coffin =

American shipowner and whale oil merchant

- Born: June 3, 1764; Nantucket
- Died: July 8, 1828 (aged 64); Nantucket
- Occupations: Whale oil merchant, Shipowner
- Known for: One of the wealthiest whale oil merchants of his time
- Spouse(s): Abial Gardner, m. September 28, 1786
- Children: Eunice, Charles, Lydia, Frederick, Mary, Charles G., Frederick G., and Henry
- Parent(s): Micajah Coffin, Abigail (née Coleman) Coffin

Zenas Coffin (June 3, 1764 – July 8, 1828) was an American mariner and one of the wealthiest whale oil merchants and largest shipowners of his time in Nantucket, Massachusetts.

== Family life ==
Coffin was born to Micajah Coffin and Abigail (née Coleman) Coffin on Nantucket, Province of Massachusetts, on June 3, 1764. He left school aged 12 in 1776 and joined his father's whaling business on the wharves of Nantucket.

On September 28, 1786, Coffin, at age 22, married Abial Gardner. They had eight children together: Eunice, Charles, Lydia, Frederick, Mary, Charles G., Frederick G., and Henry.

== Business career ==
Coffin, with both his father, Micajah Coffin, and his brother, Gilbert Coffin, operated a Nantucket-based whaling firm during the late eighteenth and early nineteenth centuries called Micajah Coffin and Sons.

In 1791, at age 27, Coffin was the captain of a whale oil ship of 160 tons. During July 1791, Coffin became the captain of the ship named the Lydia and sailed on a whaling voyage to the Cape of Good Hope. During April 1792, Coffin returned to Nantucket with the Lydia's cargo completely full. This was the first of 15 voyages in which the Coffins were sole or part owners of this ship which brought in over half a million dollars to the Nantucket Coffin family and others.

On June 23, 1812, Coffin, with a group of other Nantucket men [Daniel Coffin, Isaac Coffin, Silvanus Macy, Obed Macy, James Barker, Paul Gardner, Jr., and George Gardner II] created the corporation known as the Phoenix Bank.

On June 12, 1818, Coffin incorporated the Nantucket Phoenix Insurance Company. Due to his large whaling ship fleet, Coffin felt it best to self insure his ships.

During 1800 to 1820, both Zenas and Gilbert were owners of many ships, but evidence shows that Gilbert was in charge during that time. By 1819, the business lead shifts to Zenas. By 1820, Zenas appears as sole "owner and manager" and, until his death in 1828, he sent out the following ships: Independence, States, Washington, Constitution, Lydia, Hyeso, and John Jay. Zenas directed most of John Jay's sailings for twenty years which yielded over 1400 barrels of oil which sold for more than $250,000.

On July 29, 1823, one of the firm's ships, the Dauphin, arrived in Nantucket carrying survivors of the Essex, whose sinking inspired the novel Moby Dick.

== War of 1812 Effect On Whaling Business ==
The War of 1812 created a crisis for the whaling industry as it was too risky to venture the ocean. At the beginning of the War, Coffin had a large supply of oil and held it waiting for higher prices. In 1810, the average price was 75 cents per gallon and when the War began, it jumped to $1.25 per gallon. Throughout the duration of the War, since little new oil was brought in, the price remained high and Coffin sold at a great advantage.

During the War, the Nantucketers sought to remain neutral which resulted in both sides charging the islanders with helping the other side. Both sides also blocked the harbor and held up ships as they tried to keep the island supplied with food and fuel from off-island. Coffin joined the other town leaders in helping. A petition signed by 200 Nantucketers was sent to the British Admiral Cochrane asking for their help. Nantucket delegates were also sent to the then two major political parties, the Democrats and the Federalists. All the appeals to both sides did not give the impression of unity to either the British or the United States.

In the winter of 1814/1815, a "soup house" (or soup kitchen) was created in a building near the Town House to help the distress of the poor on the island. Coffin's name appears in records as serving on committees and making contributions to help make the "soup house" possible.

== Opinions on Education ==
Coffin opposed "public schools" and believed them to be a "Boston notion". He did not oppose education and believed there should be plenty of it, but did not believe in taxing everyone in a town to do so.

== Death ==
Coffin died in the early morning hours on July 8, 1828, on Nantucket and left no will. His father, Micajah, only died about a year earlier. The same year, Coffin's two sons, Charles G. and Henry Coffin, began their business under the firm name of CG & H Coffin.

Coffin's two sons, Charles G. and Henry Coffin, along with his three son-in-laws, Thomas Macy, Matthew Crosby, and Henry Swift were joint administrators of Zenas Coffin's estate. The estate included the holding of over 150,000 gallons of whale oil, landholdings, houses and house-lots, stores, wharf property, and oil ships. The estate records show a final total of 200 items in inventory which must have had a value of nearly half a million dollars at that time. Coffin's widow Abial had little confidence in banks and tried to get her share in gold. She died 28 years after her husband.

== See also ==
- Coffin (whaling family)
- Coffin (surname)
