= Micajah Coffin =

American mariner, politician, and triangle trader

Member of the Massachusetts House of Representatives Nantucket District
- In office 1791–1812

Personal details
- Born: August 18, 1734 Nantucket
- Died: May 25, 1827 (aged 92)
- Other political affiliations: Society of Friends
- Spouse(s): Abigail Coleman, m. June 1, 1757
- Children: Isaiah Coffin, Gilbert Coffin, Jedida Coffin, Zenas Coffin
- Parent(s): Benjamin and Jedida (née Hussey) Coffin
- Occupation: Mariner and trader in the whaling industry.

Micajah Coffin (August 18, 1734 – May 25, 1827) was an American mariner, triangle trader, and politician who served as a member of the Massachusetts House of Representatives.

== Early life ==
Coffin was born to Benjamin and Jedida (née Hussey) Coffin on Nantucket, Province of Massachusetts, August 18, 1734. Of all his siblings, he was the one who became proficient in Latin and was able to have conversations in the Latin language with his father to the admiration and amazement of their friends. He worked as a carpenter in his early years.

== Family life ==
On June 1, 1757, Micajah Coffin, at age 23, married Abigail Coleman, the daughter of Elihu Coleman, a distinguished Quaker preacher of his day, in the Nantucket Quaker Meeting House. They had four children: Isaiah, Gilbert, Jedida, and Zenas Coffin. Their youngest son, Zenas Coffin, became Nantucket's wealthiest eighteenth century triangle trade merchant. His first cousin was Sir Admiral Isaac Coffin.

== Business career ==
Coffin was one of the leading mariners and triangle traders in the import and export of whale oil. Coffin and two of his sons, Gilbert Coffin and Zenas Coffin, operated a Nantucket based whaling firm during the late eighteenth and early nineteenth centuries called Micajah Coffin and Sons. Their firm conducted business dealing in whale oil, candles, potash, and supplies to Nantucket. Their firm not only conducted trade in eastern United States ports, but also in the West Indies, France, Nova Scotia, Brazil, and England. Their firm became very wealthy in the triangle trade and laid the foundation for Zenas Coffin's future fortune which he later used to enrich the island.

Coffin's first sailing vessels were sloops that went on short whaling and trading cruises. Micajah was either the owner or had business interests in the following sloops:

- FAME
- HEPZEBAH
- WOOLF
- SPEEDWELL
- FRIENDSHIP
- BROTHERS

In 1790, large-scale business began when Micajah bought the ship the LYDIA. The LYDIA could carry eight hundred barrels of oil (or freight equivalent). The first large-sized ships owned by the firm were:

- LYDIA
- HEBE
- WHALE
- TRIAL
- DIANA
- BROTHERS
- PHEBE
- CATO

== Political career ==
In 1791, at age 57, Coffin was elected by a large vote to represent Nantucket County as a member of the Massachusetts House of Representatives. He served this office for 21 years, from 1791 to 1812. For his first 15 years, he was the only representative for Nantucket County.

On May 29, 1795, Coffin offered an act to the House to change their town's name from the "Town of Sherborn" in Nantucket County to the "Town of Nantucket" in Nantucket County. The reason for the act was to prevent confusion resulting from the Commonwealth of Massachusetts having another town with the same name, Sherborn. as there was another town with the same name in the Commonwealth of Massachusetts creating confusion for people. On June 8, 1795, this bill was endorsed and signed by Governor Samuel Adams. The name "Town of Sherborn" was now officially changed to "Nantucket" in Nantucket County.

== Death ==
In Coffin's last years, he lost his mental acuteness. He died on May 25, 1827. The Governor of Massachusetts at the time, Levi Lincoln, honored Micajah by visiting him on Nantucket island the autumn before his death.

== See also ==
- Coffin (whaling family)
- Coffin (surname)
