= John Coffin =

John Coffin may refer to:

- John Coffin (judge) (died 1838), judge and army officer
- John Coffin (scientist), American virologist
- John H. C. Coffin (1815–1890), American astronomer and educator
