= Charles Coffin =

Charles Coffin may refer to:

- Charles Coffin (writer) (1676–1749), French writer, educator and Jansenist
- Charles A. Coffin (1844–1926), first president of General Electric corporation
- Charles Carleton Coffin (1823–1896), author of several historic manuscripts
- Charles D. Coffin (1805–1880), U.S. representative from Ohio
- Charles E. Coffin (1841–1912), U.S. congressman from Maryland
- Charles L. Coffin (1844–1926), American inventor of arc welding process
- Charles William Floyd Coffin (1888–1968), mayor of Englewood, New Jersey
- C. Hayden Coffin (1862–1935), English actor and singer
