= Gideon Gardner =

American politician (1759–1832)

Member of the U.S. House of Representatives from Massachusetts's 8th district
- In office March 4, 1809 – March 3, 1811
- Preceded by: Isaiah L. Green
- Succeeded by: Isaiah L. Green

Personal details
- Born: May 30, 1759 Nantucket, Province of Massachusetts Bay, British America
- Died: March 22, 1832 (aged 72) Nantucket, Massachusetts, U.S.
- Resting place: Friends Burying Ground
- Party: Democratic-Republican

Gideon Gardner (May 30, 1759 – March 22, 1832) was an American merchant and politician who served one term as a U.S. representative from Massachusetts from 1809 to 1811.

== Biography ==
Born in Nantucket in the Province of Massachusetts Bay, Gardner received a limited schooling.

=== Early career ===
Gardner was a successful ship master, and later became a shipowner. Gardner also engaged in mercantile pursuits. He was reportedly owner of the Ganges (1809 whaler) when "Gardner's Island" was discovered.

=== Congress ===
Gardner was elected as a Democratic-Republican Party to the Eleventh Congress (March 4, 1809 – March 3, 1811).

=== Later career ===
He resumed his former business pursuits. He was the bearer of a petition from the citizens of Nantucket to Congress for tax relief in 1813.

=== Death and burial ===
He died in Nantucket, Massachusetts, March 22, 1832. He was interred in Friends Burying Ground.

Gardner was a direct descendant of Thomas Gardner (planter).

== See also ==
- Gardner (whaling family)

U.S. House of Representatives
| Preceded by Isaiah L. Green | Member of the U.S. House of Representatives from Massachusetts's 8th congressional district March 4, 1809 - March 3, 1811 | Succeeded by Isaiah L. Green |
