= Ganges (1809 whaler) =

American marine vessel

History

United States
- Owner: Gideon Gardner (reputedly), Nantucket, Massachusetts
- Builder: Haverhill, Massachusetts
- Launched: 1809
- Homeport: Nantucket, Massachusetts
- Fate: Condemned 1858

General characteristics
- Tons burthen: 1809: 265 (bm); 1836: 315 (bm)

Ganges, was a whaleship from Nantucket, Massachusetts, launched in 1809 in Massachusetts, that operated in the Pacific Ocean from 1815 to 1853. It was probably the vessel reported to have found Gardner Island in the Phoenix group. Although Barzillai Folger, the master of the ship during its voyage of 1835–39, is sometimes credited with being the first to discover the right whales of the Northwest coast, the Frenchman Narcisse Chaudiere, in Gange, preceded Folger. Chaudiere cruised on this ground during the summer of 1835, while Folger didn't leave port until October 26 of the same year.

== Discovery of Gardner Island ==
Capt. Joshua Gardner, reportedly on board the whaleship Ganges, discovered an island in 1825, located at 4°20′S 174°22′W, and named it "Gardner's Island". His discovery was reported in the Nantucket Enquirer, December 1827. However, contemporary Joshua Coffin (also reportedly on Ganges) is sometimes credited with the discovery, naming the island after his ship's owner, Gideon Gardner.

== Voyages ==
Between 1815 and 1858, Ganges made 11 whaling voyages:

Departure	Return	Master	Sperm oil (barrels)	Whale oil (barrels)	Notes
1815, Aug	1817, Oct	Ray, Isaiah	1785	139	
1818, Jun	1821, Jun	Ray, Isaiah	1616	0	
1821, Aug	1824, Mar	Coffin, Joshua	1823	0	
1825, Jun	1827, Nov	Coffin, Joshua	1665	0	
1828, Aug	1831, May	Coffin, Joshua	1660	0	Visited Pitcairn Island (20 January 1829)
1832, Jun	1835, Aug	Bodfish, Russell S.	1467	0	
1835, Oct	1839, May	Folger, Barzillai T.	1644	0	
1841, Jul	1845, May	Pitman, George	732	476	
1845, Jul	1849, Jun	Nichols, James	1910	0	
1849, Sep	1853, Jul	Coffin, Thomas M., II	1813	0	
1853, Oct	1857, Mar	Nicholson, John Beard	850	0	
