= Macy–Colby House =

Historic house in Massachusetts, United States

- U.S. National Register of Historic Places
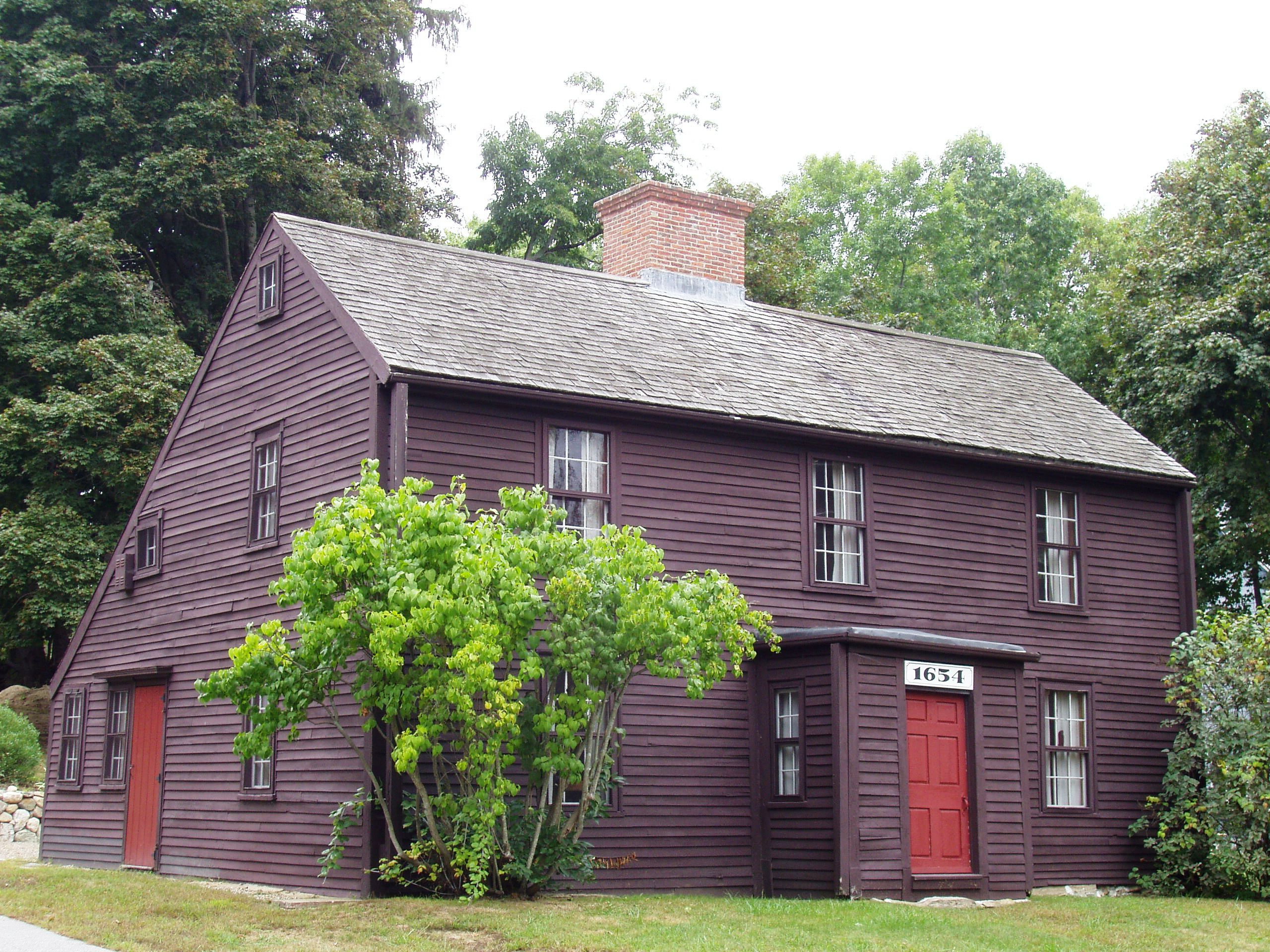

- Location within Massachusetts Location within the United States
- Location: 257 Main St., Amesbury, Massachusetts
- Coordinates: 42°50′45.3″N 70°55′46.32″W
- Built: c.1745; 281 years ago (NRHP)
- Architectural style: Colonial
- NRHP reference No.: 08000531
- Added to NRHP: June 16, 2008

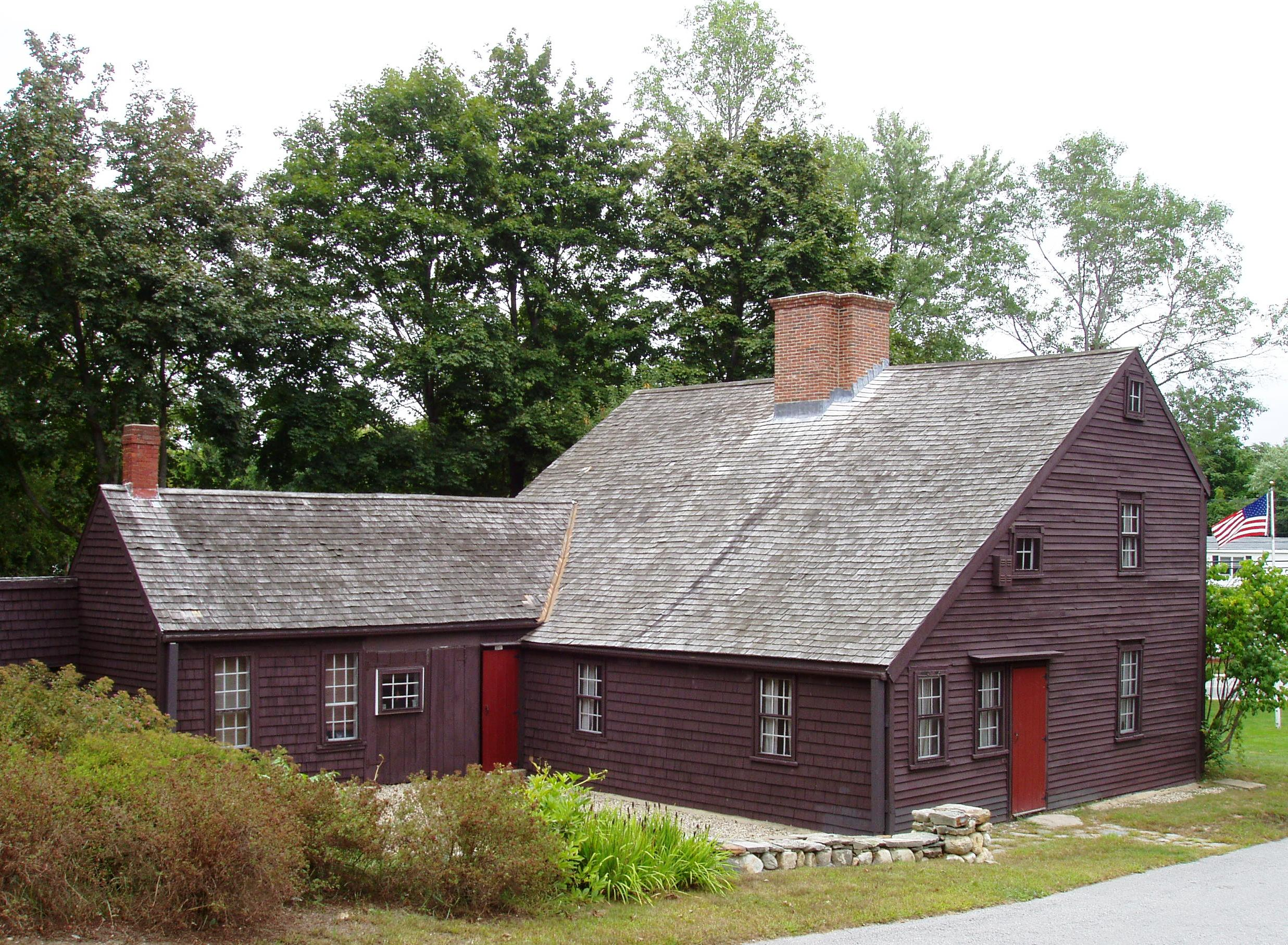
Macy–Colby House, rear view.

The Macy–Colby House is a historically significant saltbox house at 257 Main Street in Amesbury, Massachusetts. It is a historic house museum and has been listed on the National Register of Historic Places since 2008. In addition to its great age, it is notable for its association with Thomas Macy, an early settler of Nantucket and the subject of a poem by John Greenleaf Whittier, and for its long association with the locally significant Colby family.

== History ==
The Macy–Colby House was originally built by Thomas Macy, probably about 1649, and sold to Anthony Colby in 1654. The saltbox structure was extensively modified by Obadiah Colby (1706–1749) in the early 1740s.

Thomas Macy was Amesbury's first town clerk; he held many town offices, and was involved in numerous land transactions. He left Amesbury in 1659 after years of conflict with local Puritan leaders, most notably over giving shelter to Quakers in this house. He became the first European settler to establish his family on the island of Nantucket. Macy became the subject of a poem by the 19th-century poet John Greenleaf Whittier entitled "The Exile", depicting the plight of Quakers in the religiously intolerant Puritan society of colonial Massachusetts.

Anthony Colby (1605–1660/61) came to America with the Winthrop fleet in 1630. He first settled in Cambridge, Massachusetts, and was in Salisbury, Massachusetts, by 1640. He was one of the first settlers of the new town of Amesbury in 1650. He was active in town affairs, served in various offices, and was part owner of a local sawmill.

Anthony Colby's descendants owned the Macy–Colby property for 245 years; nine generations of Colbys lived in this house. In 1899, Moses Colby (1822–1901) donated the house and property to the Bartlett Cemetery Association as a memorial to the Colby and Macy families, and to the people of Amesbury, Massachusetts. The property is maintained by the Friends of the Macy–Colby House Association, and is open to the public on Saturdays during the summer.

This house dates to ca. 1745 according to the Massachusetts Historical Commission/ Massachusetts Cultural Resources Information System.

== See also ==
- List of historic houses in Massachusetts
- List of the oldest buildings in Massachusetts
- National Register of Historic Places listings in Essex County, Massachusetts
