= Isaiah L. Green =

American politician (1761–1841)

Member of the U.S. House of Representatives from Massachusetts's 8th district
- In office March 4, 1805 – March 3, 1809
- Preceded by: Lemuel Williams
- Succeeded by: Gideon Gardner
- In office March 4, 1811 – March 3, 1813
- Preceded by: Gideon Gardner
- Succeeded by: John Reed Jr.

Personal details
- Born: Isaiah L. Green; December 28, 1761 Barnstable, Province of Massachusetts Bay, British America
- Died: December 5, 1841 (aged 79) Cambridge, Massachusetts, U.S.
- Resting place: Old Cambridge Cemetery
- Party: Democratic-Republican
- Education: Harvard
- Profession: Attorney

Isaiah Lewis Green (December 28, 1761 – December 5, 1841) was an American lawyer and politician who served three terms as a U.S. representative from Massachusetts in the early 19th century.

== Biography ==
Born in Barnstable in the Province of Massachusetts Bay, Green pursued classical studies, and graduated from Harvard in 1781. He studied law.

He was admitted to the bar and practiced.

=== Congress ===
Green was elected as a Democratic-Republican to the Ninth and Tenth Congresses (March 4, 1805 – March 3, 1809).

Green was elected to the Twelfth Congress (March 4, 1811 – March 3, 1813).

=== Later career ===
He was appointed by President Madison collector of customs for the district of Barnstable, Massachusetts, in 1814 and served until 1837.

He resumed the practice of law.

=== Death and burial ===
He died in Cambridge, Massachusetts, on December 5, 1841. He was interred in the Old Cambridge Cemetery.

U.S. House of Representatives
Preceded by Lemuel Williams	Member of the U.S. House of Representatives from Massachusetts's 8th congressional district March 4, 1805 – March 3, 1809	Succeeded by Gideon Gardner
Preceded by Gideon Gardner	Member of the U.S. House of Representatives from Massachusetts's 8th congressional district March 4, 1811 – March 3, 1813	Succeeded by John Reed, Jr.
