= Reuben Clare Coffin =

American geologist (1886–1972)

Reuben Clare Coffin (went by Clare) (October 29, 1886 – September 10, 1972) was an American geologist whose work in petroleum exploration, structural mapping, and uranium‑vanadium investigations contributed to the early understanding of the geology of the Colorado Plateau. The uranium‑bearing mineral coffinite was named in his honor in 1955.

== Early life ==
Coffin was born in Longmont, Colorado, into a long‑established pioneer family. His father, Reuben Fryer Coffin, a Civil War veteran of the 19th Illinois Infantry, traveled west by covered wagon in 1866 and became one of the early settlers of the St. Vrain Valley in Weld County.

== Education ==
Coffin attended elementary and high school in Longmont, Colorado. In 1905, he enrolled at the University of Colorado in Boulder, where he was active in student life as a member of the Sigma Nu fraternity and served as captain of the university’s football team during the 1908 season. He received his bachelor’s degree in 1909. In 1950, the University of Colorado awarded Coffin an honorary Doctor of Science degree, recognizing his pioneering work in geophysical exploration for Stanolind Oil and Gas Company.

== Early career ==
After graduating, Coffin joined the faculty of Longmont High School, where he taught alongside fellow University of Colorado alumna Jessie Edmonds, to whom he became engaged in 1914. Contemporary newspapers referred to him as “Professor Coffin” and noted that he also served as the school’s athletics coach.

During these years, Coffin spent his summers working in the field for the State Geological Survey, including assignments in the Paradox Valley. In 1914, the Longmont Call reported that he had been engaged in summer field work “every summer since his graduation,” experience that prepared him for his 1916 appointment as Assistant State Geologist at the University of Colorado.

Coffin was also active in Colorado athletics, and in 1912 he was selected as referee for a state college football game between the Colorado School of Mines and the Colorado Agricultural College, reflecting his reputation as the coach of a championship Longmont High School team.

== Career ==
In 1916, Coffin was appointed Assistant State Geologist at the University of Colorado, a position he assumed after several seasons of summer field work with the State Geological Survey. By 1920, he was described in the press as an assistant geologist whose structural analysis of Huerfano County was used by local oil and gas developers. In 1924, Coffin was working as a geologist for the Midwest Oil Company, and the following year he was appointed Chief Geologist of the affiliated Midwest Refining Company in Denver.

Coffin became an early advocate for geophysical exploration. A 1950 report noted that he “saw at an early stage and understood the value of geophysical work,” and that he initiated such work for his company in 1926, making him a pioneer of geophysical methods in the Rocky Mountain region. After retirement from corporate work, Coffin continued consulting as a geophysical coordinator for Stanolind Oil and Gas Company and geologist for the Atomic Energy Commission, assisting geological groups as they searched for domestic uranium ores.

== Family ==
He met his wife, Jessie Edmonds, at the University in Boulder and taught with at Longmont High School. Clare's father, Reuben Fryer Coffin (1842-1928), enlisted with Company G. 19th Illinois Infantry during the Civil War. He later became a prominent settler pioneer of the present Longmont Colorado area, who settled in the St Vrain valley area of Colorado from Illinois in 1866. Clare's mother was Lydia E Coffin (1853-1936). He had three brothers and one sister: Claude C Coffin, attorney of Fort Collins, then District Judge,, Major Roy Coffin, Stanley Coffin, member of Torrey’s Rough Riders during the Spanish-American war, Vinton Coffin, geologist, and Ruby Harrington (Coffin).

Clare is a descendent of Tristram Coffin (settler), as are most US Coffins.

== Publications ==
- Coffin, R. Clare (1946). "Recent Trends in Geological–Geophysical Exploration and Methods of Improving Use of Geophysical Data". AAPG Bulletin 30 (12): 2013–2033. doi:10.1306/3D9338D8-16B1-11D7-8645000102C1865D.
- Coffin, R. Clare (1933). "Preface: Colorado Symposium". AAPG Bulletin 17 (4): 351–352. doi:10.1306/3D932B3A-16B1-11D7-8645000102C1865D.
- Coffin, R. Clare; DeFord, Ronald K. (1934). "Waters of the Oil‑ and Gas‑Bearing Formations of the Rocky Mountains". In: Problems of Petroleum Geology. AAPG Special Volume. doi:10.1306/SV6334C45.
- Coffin, R. Clare (1954). "Uranium Deposits and General Geology of Southeastern Utah". In: Guidebook to the Geology of Utah, no. 9, pp. 1–7.
- Coffin, R. Clare (1954). "History of Radium–Uranium Mining in the Plateau Province". In: Guidebook to the Geology of Utah, no. 9.
