= Manor of Monkleigh =

Mediaeval manor in North Devon, England

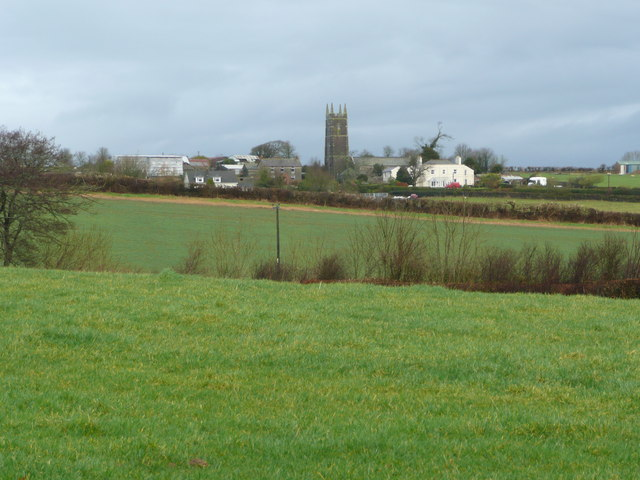
Monkleigh, North Devon

The Manor of Monkleigh was a mediaeval manor centred on the village of Monkleigh in North Devon, England, situated 2 1/2 miles north-west of Great Torrington and 3 1/2 miles south-east of Bideford.

== Descent of the manor ==
The Domesday Book of 1086 records Monkleigh as Lege, the ninth of the 79 holdings in Devon as tenant-in-chief, of Robert, Count of Mortain (c. 1031–1090) the half-brother of William the Conqueror. His tenant at Monkleigh was a certain Alured, modernised to Alfred. Before the Norman Conquest of 1066 it was held by the Saxon Ordulf, thought to represent the Anglo-Saxon name "Ordwulf".

During the reign of King Stephen (1135–1154) the manor of Monkleigh was granted by its then holder "Alfred the Butler", together with his other estates of Frizenham (in the parish of Little Torrington.) and Densham (in the parish of Woolfardisworthy), to Montacute Priory.

=== Coffin ===
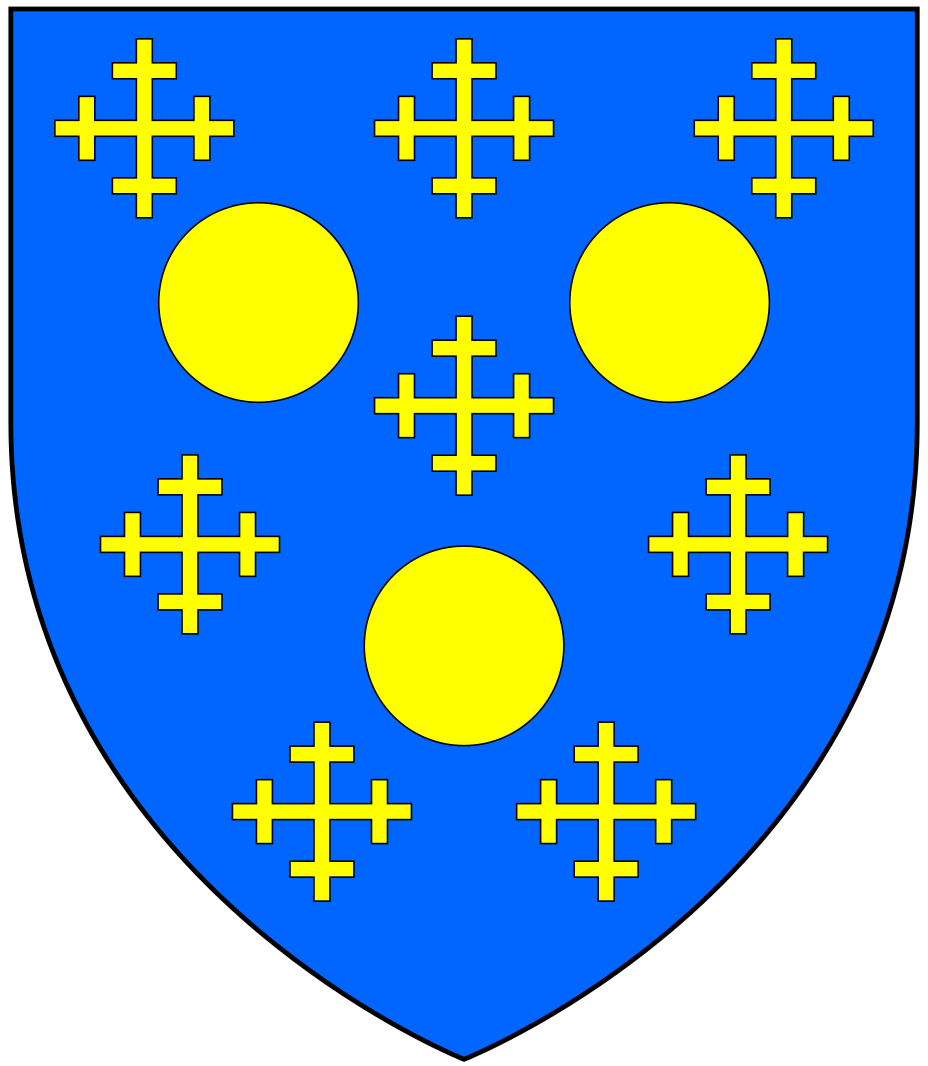
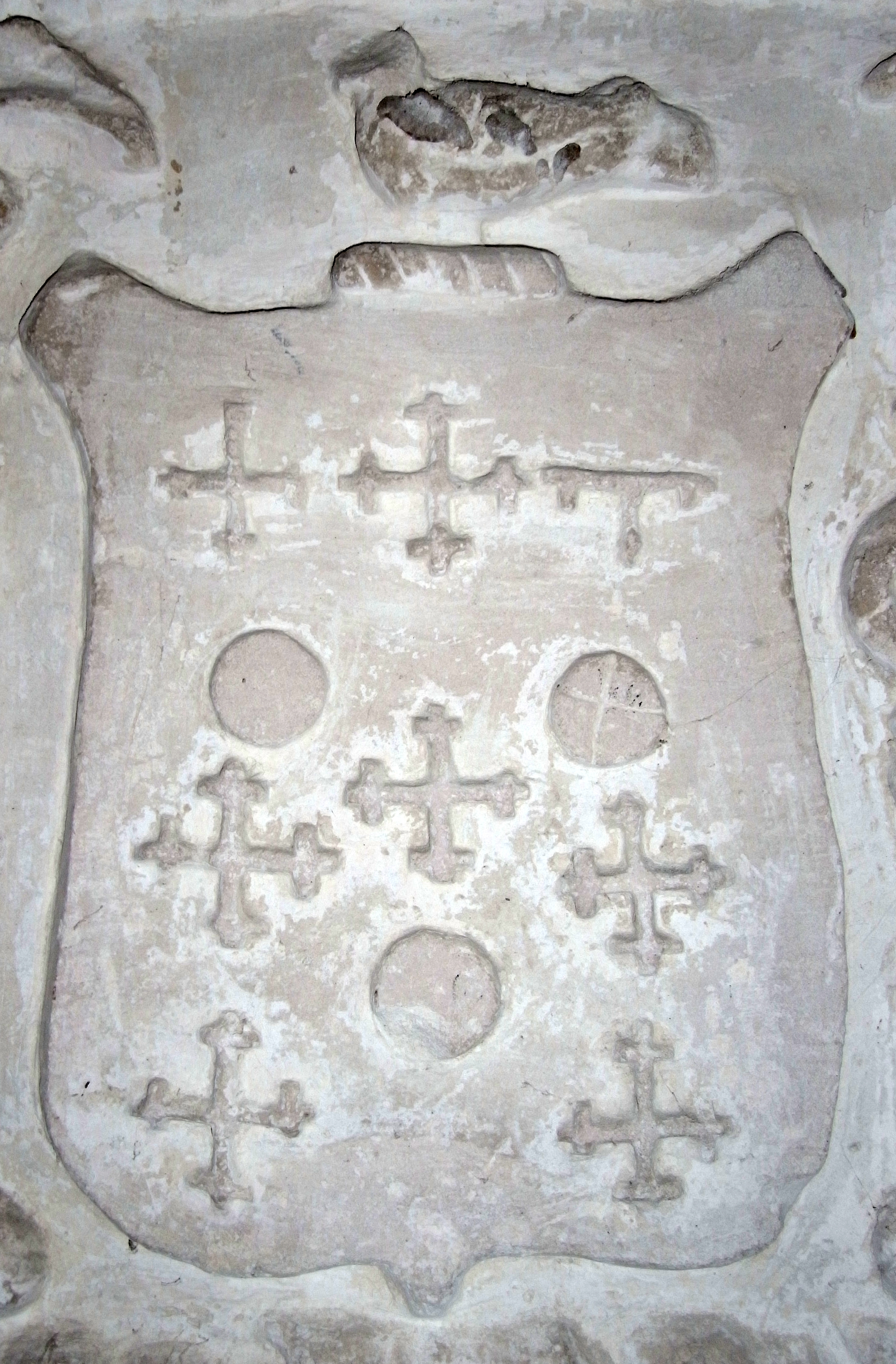
Arms of Coffin family, lords of the manor of Monkleigh: Azure, three bezants between eight crosses crosslet or, and right as seen on 16th century Coffin mural monument in Monkleigh Church, with a crest of a bird of some variety

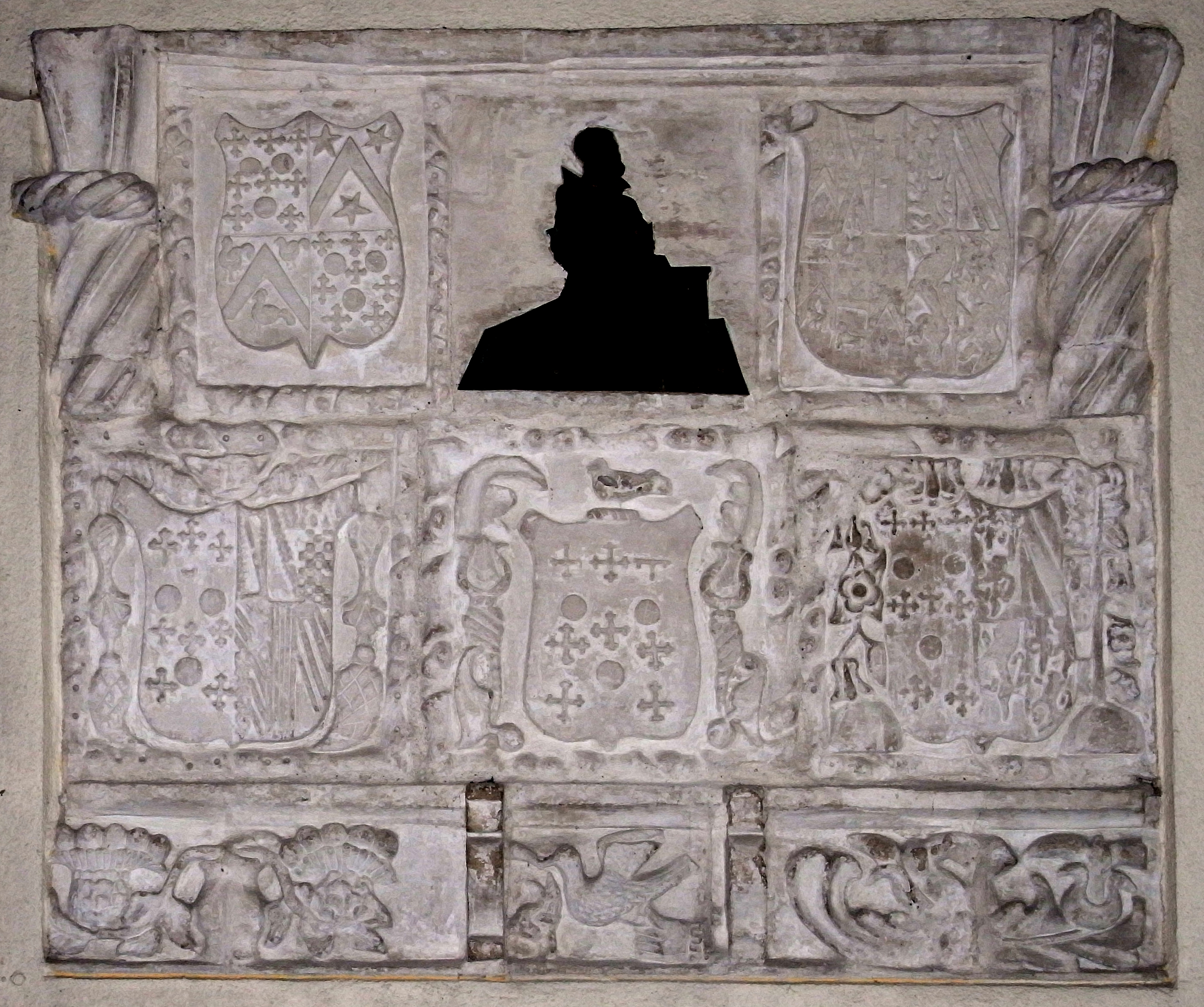
16th century mural monument to a kneeling knight, featuring heraldry of the Coffin family. Monkleigh Church, high up on north wall of chancel. Monumental brass depicting a bearded knight, said to represent James Coffin (died 1566) kneeling in prayer, surrounded by heraldic escutcheons depicting the arms of Coffin: Azure, three bezants between eight crosses crosslet or

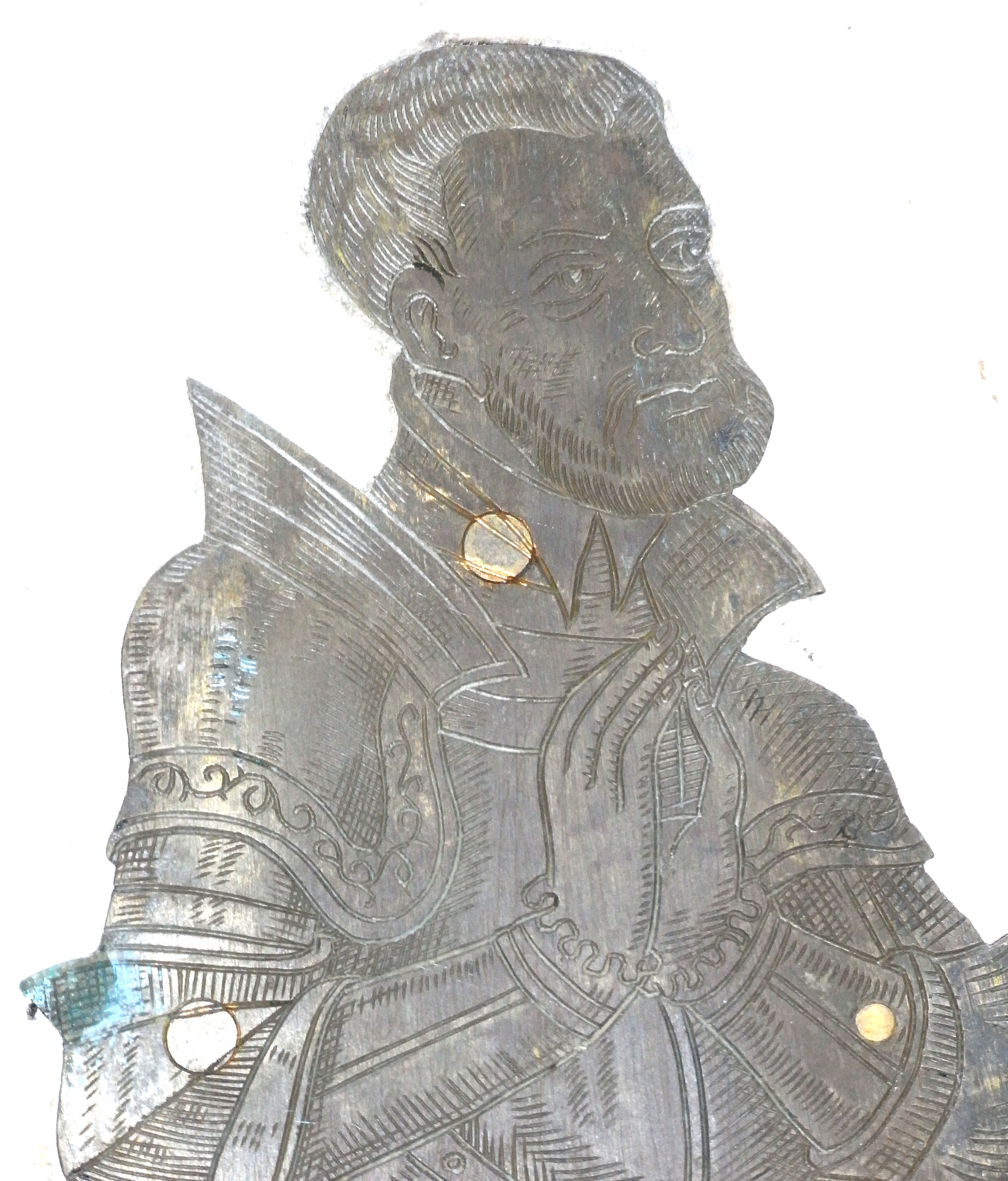
Detail of James Coffin monumental brass, Monkleigh Church.

Following the Dissolution of the Monasteries, a lease of the manor of Monkleigh was granted by the crown gratis on 26 August 1540 to James Coffyn of Alwington and Anne his wife for the term of her life. It was valued at £21 11s 6d per annum, but unusually no charge was made for the grant. As is recorded in the text of the royal grant Anne was the widow of Sir George St Leger of Annery, the chief estate within the manor of Monkleigh.

James Coffin was the second son of John Coffin of Portledge, in the parish of Alwington. He was still living in 1551 when he was mentioned in the will of his eldest brother Richard Coffin (died 1555) of Portledge. The Coffin family is one of the most ancient of Devon families. Tristram Risdon (died 1640) stated: "Alwington...the manor whereof hath been in the name of Coffin even from The Conquest".

On 11 June 1544 the crown granted the manor of Monkleigh, subject to the life interest of James Coffin and his wife, to Sir John Fulford of Dunsford and Humphrey Colles of Barton, Somerset, along with other grants of property. For Monkleigh manor they were charged £194 3s 4d, representing 10 years' purchase of its annual value. They were also granted Monkleigh Woods for £29 13s 6d, representing 20 years' purchase Fulford and Coles paid the purchase price in full on 2 June 1544 and just one week later obtained royal licence to alienate to James Coffin of Alwington, the life tenant.

A small monumental brass of a kneeling knight exists in Monkleigh Church high up on the north wall of the chancel, affixed to a stone tablet on which are sculpted several heraldic escutcheons of the arms of Coffin (Azure, three bezants between eight crosses crosslet or) impaling arms of their heiresses. Pevsner suggests a date for the brass of 16th. century and that the stone tablet on which it is now affixed was originally part of a now lost 16th. century monument.

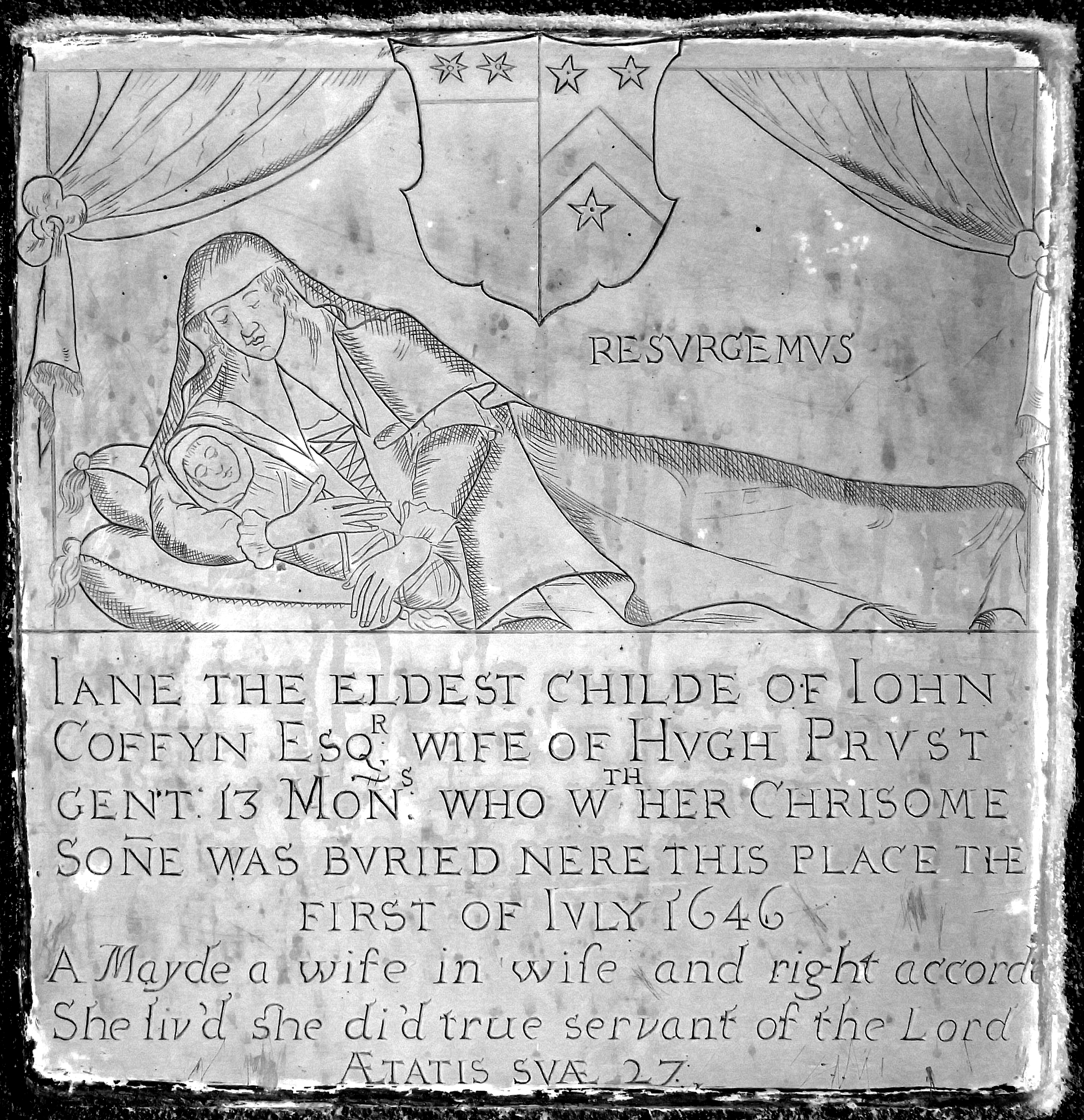
Inscribed slate mural monument to Jane Coffyn (died 1646), Monkleigh Church, west wall of north transept. Inscription: "Resurgimus" (we will rise again) "Jane the eldest childe of John Coffyn Esqr wife of Hugh Prust, gent, 13 Mons" "who w(i)th her chrisome son(n)e was buried nere this place the first of July 1646". "A mayde a wife in wife and right accord, She liv'd she di'd true servant of the Lord. Aetatis suae 27" (of her age 27). At the top is a heraldic escutcheon showing the arms of Prust impaling the arms of Coffyn. (Note: These are not the arms of Coffyn given in the heraldic visitations of Devon, but are shown again on the monument opposite to Jane's sister Elizabeth Gay. When a family or branch of a family changes to new arms, they are referred to as "ancient" and "modern" (see e.g. Royal Arms of France for the 14th century change in those arms))

The next member of the Coffin family recorded by the heraldic visitations of Devon to have a connection with Monkleigh Church is John Coffin (1593–1622) of Portledge. John was Richard Coffin's great-grandson. Three of John's daughters were married in Monkleigh Church, between 1645 and 1657. A mural monument exists in Monkleigh Church, in the north transept, to his eldest daughter Jane Coffin (1593–1646), who in 1645, aged 26, married in Monkleigh Church to Hugh Prust (1614–1650) of Annery, within the parish of Monkleigh. She died the next year, as her mural monument records, and her husband died five years later without children, when his heir to Annery became his younger brother Lt-Col.Joseph Prust (1620–1677) of Annery."

John Coffin's son and heir was Richard Coffin (died 1700) of Portledge, Sheriff of Devon in 1683, who in 1648 married his third wife Dorothy Rowe in Monkleigh Church. His son and heir by this third wife was John Coffin (1649–1704) of Portledge, who was baptised at Monkleigh. He left no children and eventually his heir became his heir became his great-nephew Rev. John Pine-Coffin (1735–1824), the grandson of his eldest sister Dorothy Coffin (b.1651) and her husband Edward Pyne of Eastdowne. (Note: In 1810 the manor of Monkleigh was still owned by a descendant of the Coffins, namely by Rev. John Pine-Coffin of Portledge, Alwington.) Later in about 1823 his son and heir Richard Pine-Coffin (1770–1833) sold some land in his manor of Monkleigh to John Rolle, 1st Baron Rolle (died 1842) for part of the course of the Rolle Canal between about the Ridd limekilns to the Beam Aqueduct, following the left-bank of the River Torridge. Colonel Richard Geoffrey Pine-Coffin (1908–1974) DSO & Bar, MC, born at Portledge, was a parachute officer of the British Army during World War II. The Pine-Coffin family until recently still possessed the advowson of Alwington Church, making it one of the most ancient lineages in Devon, albeit more recently via a female line, although the mansion of Portledge was converted into a hotel some time before 1959 and the estate of Portledge was sold in 1998, due to a dispute with the Inland Revenue.

== Historic estates ==
=== Annery ===
Within the manor and parish of Monkleigh is located the former historic estate of Annery. The post-Dissolution lords of the manor of Monkleigh had their main residence elsewhere outside the parish at Portledge, Alwington, and thus Annery was the most important seat within the manor and the successive holders of it had their own chapel within the parish church, at the east end of the south aisle, known as the "Annery Chapel".

== Sources ==
- William George Hoskins (1959) [1954]. A New Survey of England: Devon. London.
- Nikolaus Pevsner, Bridget Cherry (2004). The Buildings of England: Devon. London.
- "The Pine-Coffin Saga; How the taxman forced a family to sell its stake in history". Thefreelibrary.com. 16 August 1996.
- Tristram Risdon (1811). Survey of Devon.
- Susan Scrutton (2006). Lord Rolle's Canal. Great Torrington.
- Caroline Thorn, Frank Thorn and general editor John Morris, ed. (1985). Domesday Book: Devon, Part 2. Vol. 9 Devon, Parts 1 & 2. Chichester: Phillimore Press.
- Lt.Col. J.L. Vivian, ed. (1895). The Visitations of the County of Devon: Comprising the Heralds' Visitations of 1531, 1564 & 1620. Exeter.
- Joyce Youings. Devon Monastic Lands: Calendar of Particulars for Grants 1536-1558. Vol. 1. Devon & Cornwall Record Society, New Series. Torquay, 1955
