= Mary Kearney =

American biologist

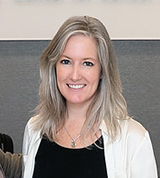
- Kearney in 2019
- Education: Hood College (BA, MS); Catholic University of America (PhD)
- Scientific career
- Fields: HIV and translational research
- Workplaces: National Cancer Institute
- Thesis: HIV-1 evolution in recently infect patients (2007)
- Academic advisors: Luke Pallansch; Venigalla B. Rao; John Coffin

Mary F. Kearney is an American biologist. She is a senior scientist and head of the translational research section in the HIV dynamics and replication program at the National Cancer Institute.

== Education ==
Kearney completed a B.A. (1996) and M.S. in biomedical science (2001) at Hood College. Her master's thesis was titled Determining the resistance profile of conocurvone, an early-stage inhibitor of HIV-1 replication. Her advisor was Luke Pallansch. Kearney received a Ph.D. in biology from Catholic University of America in 2007 under the direction of John Coffin, Sarah Palmer, and Venigalla B. Rao. Her thesis was titled HIV-1 evolution in recently infect patients. She received The Benedict T. DeCicco Award for Excellence in Graduate Research in 2008.

== Career and research ==
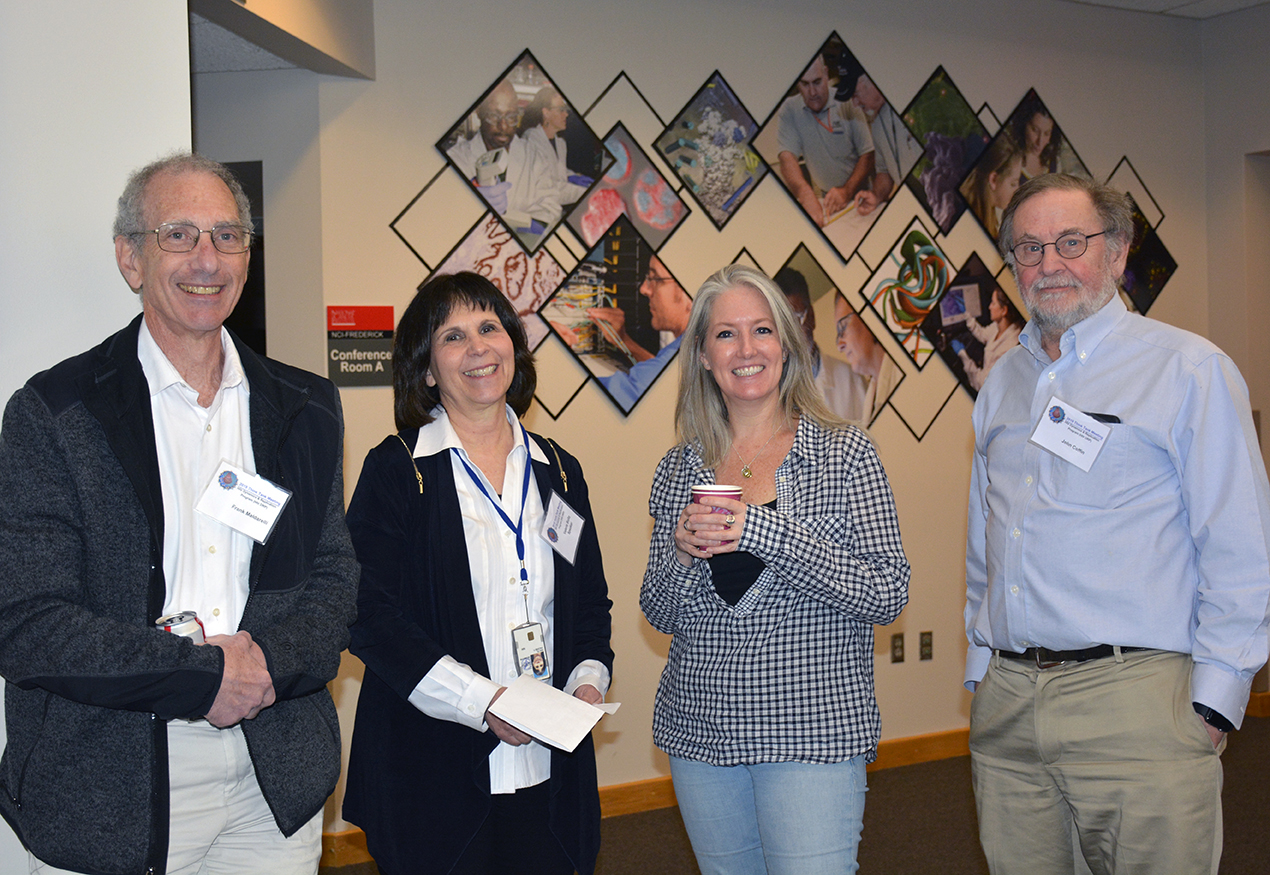
Kearney, Coffin, and colleagues at the 2019 HIV DRP Think Tank Meeting.

In 2001 she joined the National Cancer Institute's HIV Drug Resistance Program (DRP; renamed the HIV Dynamics and Replication Program in 2015) as a biologist in the virology core. In 2008 she was promoted to head of the translational research section where she oversees a team that investigates HIV genetics and expression in vivo, the sources of persistent viremia during antiretroviral therapy (ART), the sources of rebound viremia after stopping ART, the mechanisms for maintaining the HIV reservoir, and the mechanisms for the emergence of HIV drug resistance mutations. She was a consultant to the World Health Organization from 2010 to 2016, was the keynote speaker for the launch of the Bioinformatics Program at Hood College in 2015 and for the Center for AIDS Research Symposium at the University of Pennsylvania in 2019, and was appointed to the NIH Women Scientist Advisors (WSA) in 2018. She currently serves as Chair of the WSA Executive Committee and as an advisor to the Bioinformatics Program and Biology Department at Hood College. In 2019 she was promoted to senior scientist.

Kearney's scientific focus areas include clinical research, microbiology, infectious diseases, and virology. Her areas of expertise include HIV drug resistance, HIV persistence, HIV residual viremia, HIV cure, HIV evolution, and HIV genetics. In 2019, Kearney, Sean Patro, and colleagues, advanced the understanding of proviral integration sites in a host cell's DNA. Previously, scientists had not been able to link such sites with the populations of identical HIV proviruses that persist in patients on treatment.

== Awards and honors ==
Kearney is the recipient of three Bench-to-Beside Awards, three NIH Intramural AIDS Targeted Antiviral Program Awards, and a U.S.–South Africa Initiative U01 Grant. Kearney was awarded the NIH Director's Award and NCI Group Award in 2012, the NCI Director's Award in 2015, and the CCR Group Award in 2016. Kearney received a 2019 NIH Director's Award as a member of the NIH Women Scientist Advisors (WSA) Executive Committee. Nominated by the NIH Office of the Director, the Executive Committee members received this team award for leadership of the WSA in promoting recruitment, retention, and recognition of women scientists and fair treatment with respect to salary and work environment.
