= Anna Gardner =

American writer (1816–1901)

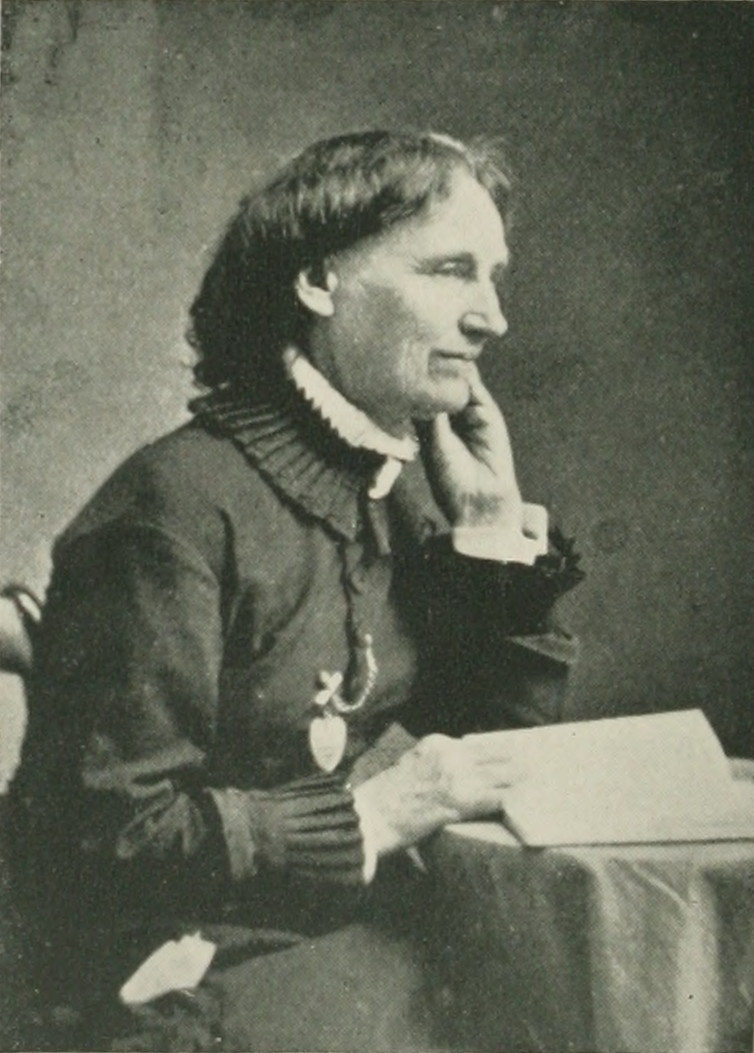
- Photo in A Woman of the Century
- Born: January 25, 1816; Nantucket, Massachusetts, U.S.
- Died: February 18, 1901 (aged 85); Nantucket, Massachusetts, U.S.
- Occupations: Abolitionist, teacher, reformer, writer
- Relatives: Peter Folger, Benjamin Franklin, Lucretia Mott, Maria Mitchell, Tristram Coffin
- Writing career
- Language: English
- Notable work: Harvest Gleanings

Anna Gardner (January 25, 1816 – February 18, 1901) was an American abolitionist and teacher, as well as an ardent reformer, a staunch supporter of women's rights, and the author of several volumes in prose and verse. In 1841, she published the call for the first antislavery meeting in Nantucket, at which Frederick Douglass made his first public speech and electrified his audience. She delivered many lectures during the years immediately preceding the American Civil War, and after the war, she taught in freedmen's schools in Virginia, North Carolina, and South Carolina. In 1878, she returned to New York, where soon afterward, she was severely injured in a carriage accident. After many weeks of suffering and a partial recovery, she returned to her old home in Nantucket. She lectured several times before the Nantucket Athenaeum. Gardner was a fluent writer, and in 1881, she published her best work in a volume of prose and verse entitled Harvest Gleanings.

== Early life ==
Anna Gardner was born in Nantucket, Massachusetts, January 25, 1816. She was of Quaker ancestry. Her father, Oliver C. Gardner, was related to most of the prominent families in Nantucket, among whom were the Cartwrights, and through them Gardner was descended from Peter Folger, the grandfather of Benjamin Franklin, and she was thus related to Lucretia Mott, Maria Mitchell, and other distinguished men and women. Through her mother, Hannah Mackerel Gardner, she descended from Tristram Coffin, the first magistrate of Nantucket. Seven generations of her ancestors lived in Nantucket. Gardner's literary tastes and talents were inherited from her mother, who was known for her love of classical poetry. On her father's side, also, she received a literary strain, as the Cartwright family has produced poets in each generation.

When a girl, she read The Liberator and became interested in the antislavery cause.

== Career ==
Gardner became aware of slavery at an early age. She became a student, teacher, lecturer, and worker in the cause of human liberty and equal rights. She was a regular reader of The Liberator when she was eighteen years old. In 1841, she was instrumental in calling a remarkable antislavery meeting in Nantucket when she was twenty-five years of age, which was largely attended. At this convention, Frederick Douglass made his first oration as an abolitionist speaker. He had been exhorting in the Methodist Church and was unprepared for the call made upon him. Nevertheless, he responded and electrified his audience. Gardner spent many years in teaching the freed men in the South. Her work was done in North Carolina, South Carolina, and Virginia.

She returned to the North in 1878, and in Brooklyn, New York, she was injured by a carriage accident. After long weeks of suffering, a partial recovery, and crutches, she returned to her Nantucket home, where she continued to be engaged in teaching those around her, and writing in the interests of truth and philanthropy. Besides her antislavery work, Gardner worked in the cause of women's rights. She lectured several times before the Nantucket Athenæum. In 1881, she published a volume of prose and verse, entitled Harvest Gleanings.

Gardner died in Nantucket, February 18, 1901.
