= George Coffin =

American writer and publisher

George Sturgis Coffin (September 8, 1903 – March 12, 1994) was an American writer and publisher of books on bridge and other games and a distributor of related books and supplies. He was born in Waltham, Massachusetts, and died at Waltham–Weston Hospital near his home in Belmont.

A descendant of Tristram's son Stephen Coffin, he was a 1928 graduate of Harvard and 1931 winner of The Bridge World international problem solving contest. He was also co-founder of the American Bridge Teachers Association (ABTA).

Coffin wrote more than 200 books that included bridge, poker, cribbage and other card games. At the bridge table he was known for his exceptional endplay technique (eliminations, squeezes and coups) resulting in his nickname "Endplays" Coffin, after his classic books of the same title. He also wrote about fungi, on which he was an authority.

Coffin died of congestive heart failure at age 90, survived by his daughter Harriette Johnson of Shelburne Falls, MA, and two grandchildren.

== Selected works ==
- Coffin, George (1981) [previously published in 1932, 1932, 1938, 1950, 1957, 1975]. Endplays in Bridge. Various publishers. ISBN 0-486-24230-7. – recognized as a major contribution to the technical development of the game
- Coffin, George (1975) [previously published in 1954, 1955, 1961]. Bridge Play from A to Z. Faber and Faber, London. ISBN 0-486-23891-1.
- Coffin, George (1952). Sure Tricks. Faber. – greatly revised edition (1973), revised (1975) entitled Bridge Perfect Plays and Match Points Ways
- Coffin, George (1967). Double Dummy Bridge.
- Coffin, George (1975). Bridge Play Four Classics. Duckworth. – consolidates the latest versions of the preceding four books into one
