= Gardner (whaling family) =

The Gardner family were a group of whalers operating out of Nantucket, Massachusetts, from the 17th to 19th centuries. Some members of the family gained wider exposure due to their discovery of various islands in the Pacific Ocean. By marriage, they were related to the Coffins, another Nantucket whaling family.

== Captain Gardner and the Salem Witch Trials ==
The aged and eccentric farmer Giles Corey, charged with wizardry during the Salem witch trials in 1692, refused to plead to his indictment, and as a result was subjected to the terrible death by peine fort et dure, i.e. by being crushed to death under heavy rocks. Judge Samuel Sewell in his diary records that the judges, who did not wish to inflict this barbaric penalty, asked Corey's friend Captain Gardner of Nantucket to plead with him to stand his trial in the ordinary way. Captain Gardner used his best endeavours for two days, but Sewell records that it was "all in vain."

== Edward Gardner ==
Jeremiah N. Reynolds' 1828 report to the U.S. House of Representatives describes Captain Edward Gardner's discovery of a 25-mile-long (40 km) island situated at 19°15′N 166°32′E, with a reef at the eastern edge, while captaining the Bellona in 1823. The island was "covered with wood, having a very green and rural appearance" and was probably, Reynolds concludes, Wake Island, placed on charts of the time by John Arrowsmith.

Captain Edward W. Gardner was a commercial agent at Apia, Samoa, who had traveled from Sydney on the Martha and changed vessels at Fiji for the Anita, which sailed near the Polynesian Friendly Islands during three-day hurricane from January 10 to January 12, 1863. The ship was driven ashore and found empty in May 1863. All the passengers were believed to have perished, including Captain Edward W. Gardner and his wife, Phebe Hussey Gardner of Nantucket, Massachusetts.

== George Worth Gardner ==
Born in 1778, George was given command of the whaleship Sukey in 1809. In 1811, he captained the William Penn, but the ship was captured in 1813. Later, George made three whaling voyages on the Globe (1815–18; 1818–21; 1821–22), and two on the Maria (1822–25; 1825–28). In 1818 George discovered the "Offshore Ground" (5° to 10°S and 105° to 125°W). Within two years more than fifty whaleships were cruising for sperm whales on this ground. During the first voyage on the Maria, George discovered an island in the Austral group which he named Maria, but has also been known as "Hull Island" and "Sands Island."

In his 1828 report, JN Reynolds credited George with the discovery of various other islands:

Captain George Washington Gardner discovered the following islands, &c., which are not laid down on any of the charts: An island, north latitude 30 degrees, east longitude 144 degrees; An island, north latitude 39 degrees, east longitude 39 degrees; An island, north latitude 30 degrees, east longitude 44 degrees 20 minutes; Rocks, north latitude 31 degrees, east longitude 155 degrees; An island, north latitude 37 degrees, east longitude. On the coast of New Albion, an island, north latitude 33 degrees, west longitude 119 degrees 30 minutes. On the coast of New Albion, an island, north latitude 21 degrees 55 minutes, west longitude 155 degrees 10 minutes. Maria Island, not on the charts, abounds with fish and wood, but no water; is low and dangerous. A rock, in latitude 20 degrees south, longitude 167 degrees 45 minutes west, not on charts, nor any published list; dangerous shoals in the neighborhood. Palmyra Island is in 5 degrees 58 minutes north, and 162 degrees 30 minutes west longitude. There is a dangerous reef 30 miles north, extending E.N.E. and W.N.W., very narrow, and fifteen miles in length.

George died in 1838.

== Gideon Gardner ==
Gideon (May 30, 1759 - March 22, 1832) was a successful shipmaster and ship owner; he is reputedly the owner of the whaleship Ganges, which discovered Gardner Island. He was elected as a Democratic-Republican Party to the Eleventh Congress (March 4, 1809 – March 3, 1811).

== John Gardner ==
Reynolds also reported island discoveries by John Gardner, made while he was captaining the Atlantic a short time previously:

The first island, in north latitude 8 degrees 48 minutes, longitude 144 degrees 35 minutes east. The second island, in north latitude 1 degree 7 minutes, longitude 165 degrees east. The third island, a cluster, south latitude 2 degrees 15 minutes, longitude 152 degrees 5 minutes east. Also, a cluster of reefs and shoals, extending N.N.E. and S.S.W. between the latitudes of 1 degree 35 minutes and 2 degrees 15 minutes south, and longitude 153 degrees 45 minutes and 153 degrees 15 minutes east. John Weeks, second officer, saw an island in 2 degrees north, longitude 150 degrees east, one mile long, surrounded by a coral reef six miles from shore. This island is low, and abounds in cocoa nuts.

== Joshua Gardner ==
A 19th-century whaler, Joshua is often credited with the discovery of Gardner Island (Nikumaroro), in the Phoenix group in the Pacific Ocean.

In the mid-1820s, Gardner commanded the whaleship Ganges, operating in the Pacific. He discovered an island in 1825, located at 4°20′S 174°22′W, and named it Gardner's Island. His discovery was reported in the Nantucket Enquirer, December 1827. However, contemporary Joshua Coffin is sometimes credited with the discovery.

During the United States Exploring Expedition of 1838-1842, Charles Wilkes identified Gardner's Island from the reported position, and confirmed its existence. Modern positioning places Nikumaroro (also known as Kimins Island) at 4°40′S 174°31′W.

== See also ==
- Anna Gardner, an American abolitionist, teacher, and an ardent reformer
