= Portledge Manor =

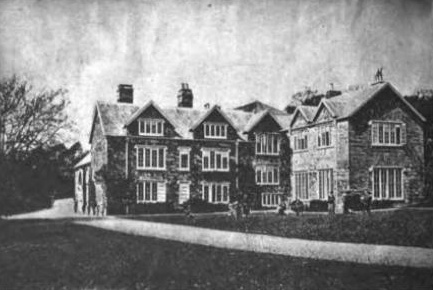
- Interactive map of the Portledge Manor area

General information
- Type: House
- Architectural style: Elizabethan
- Location: Alwington, Devon, England
- Coordinates: 50.99949°N 4.289877°W
- Construction started: 13–17th centuries

Portledge Manor is an English manor house in the parish of Alwington, southwest of Bideford, Devon. It and the land surrounding it belonged to the Coffin family, a noble family of Norman origin, for almost 1000 years.

== History ==
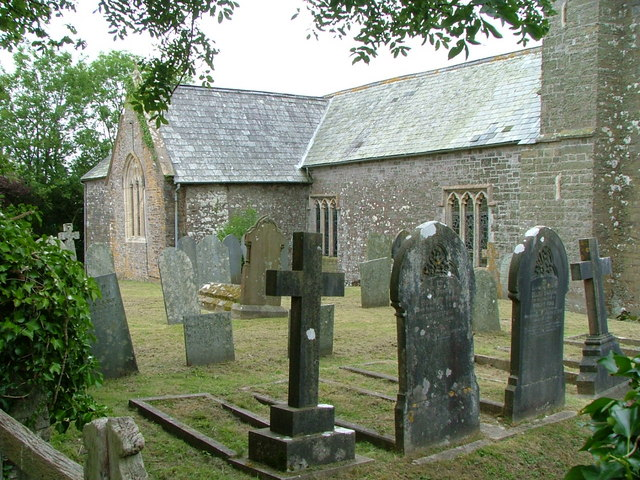
St Andrew's Church, Alwington, Devon

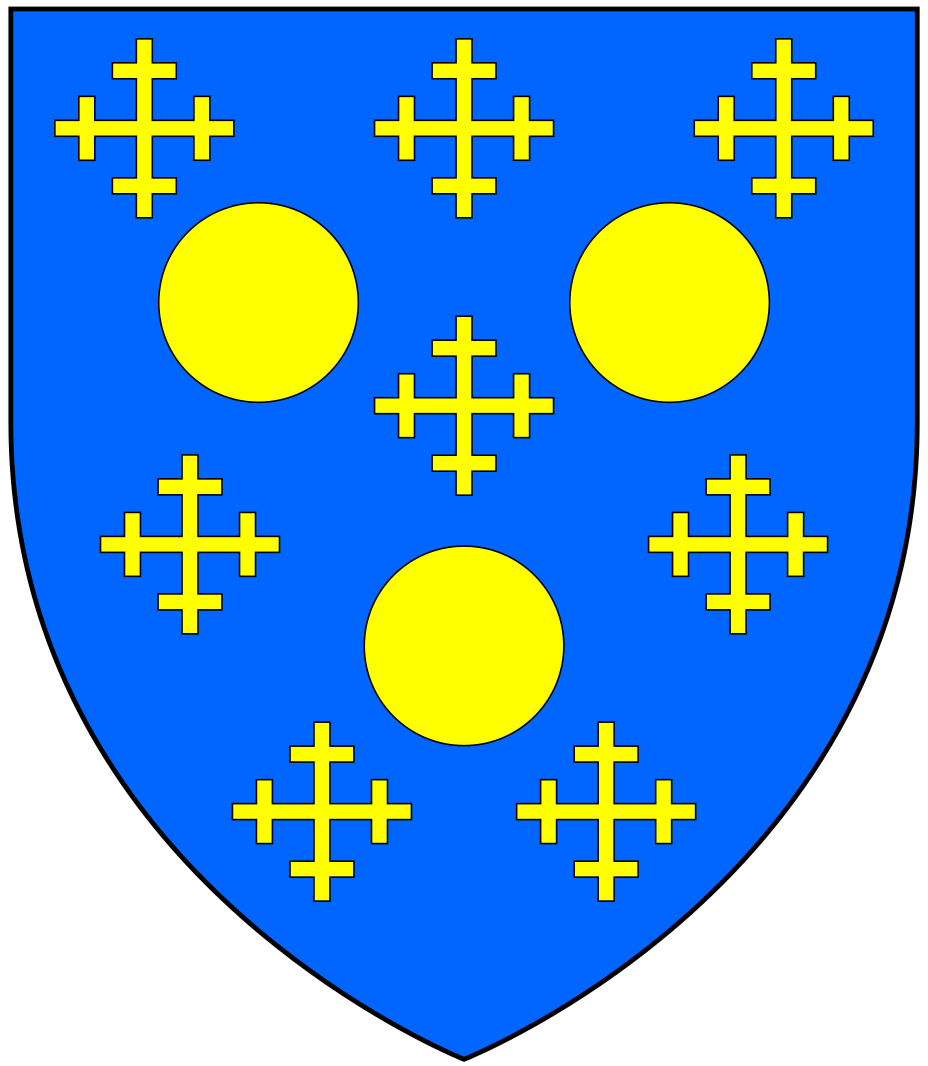
Arms of Coffin: Azure, three bezants between eight crosses crosslet or

The house sits on the edge of Bideford Bay, looking out over the Bristol Channel. The parish of Alwington and the surrounding area was given to the family by William the Conqueror, as part of a reward for loyalty and service during the Norman Conquest. Most of the current house dates from the 17th century, but parts of it have stood since the reign of King Henry III, circa 1234. The 13th-century arch of the chapel still stands and the Brew House remains from when hops were grown on the estate. The Great Hall's minstrel gallery was moved in the late 19th century to Alwington Church, a 15th-century church containing many monuments to the Pine-Coffin family. The dining-room retains a ceiling plastered with the family's coat of arms. The courtyard was roofed in and made into a new hall in the middle of the 18th century. There are many pieces of fine furniture, ancestral heirlooms, carved stone coats of arms, Spanish armour, and guns from the Spanish Armada. There is also a bell tower and a Spanish courtyard. The estate's archive, a historical record going back over 700 years, was sold to the Devon Council for almost £50,000. The family owned most of the surrounding villages, but the last of these were sold at auction in 1981. The estate itself was sold in 1998, after nine centuries in the Coffin family's hands. This was due to a dispute with Inland Revenue.

It is now the home of Michael Cannon, pub entrepreneur and former owner of Fuddrucker's restaurant chain.

== See also ==
- Richard Geoffrey Pine-Coffin
- Manor of Monkleigh, another Coffin possession
