= Coffin (whaling family) =

American whaling family

Coat of Arms of Tristram Coffin

Some members of the colonial Coffin family were whalers, agents, merchants, and traders who were prominent during the triangular trade in the United States and Canada. Coffin ship owners, captains, masters, and crew men operated triangle and bilateral trade ships out of Nantucket, Massachusetts, US eastern seaports, and Canadian seaports from the 17th to 19th centuries.

Several members of the family gained wider exposure due to their discovery of various islands in the Pacific Ocean.

== Family history ==
Tristram Coffin, born in 1609 in Brixton, Devon, sailed for America in 1642, first settling in Newbury, Massachusetts, then moving to Nantucket. The Coffins, along with other Nantucket families, including the Gardners and the Starbucks, began whaling seriously in the 1690s in local waters, and by 1715 the family owned three whaling ships (whalers) and a trade vessel. In 1763, six Coffin men were captains of Nantucket ships which sailed as far as South America and Greenland.

== James J. Coffin ==
On 31 May 1823, the British whaler Transit arrived in Batavia, on the island of Java, having lost its master, Captain Alexander, to a whale near Christmas Island. James Coffin was on Java at the time and was appointed as captain.

Later that year, while working in the central Pacific, James is said to have discovered Enderbury Island in the Phoenix group, naming it after the London whaling firm Samuel Enderby & Sons. However, when he described his own discoveries of the Bonins to Arrowsmith and other geographers, he did not mention Enderbury.

On September 12, 1824, he discovered the southern group of the Bonin Islands.

== Joshua Coffin ==
Some records suggest that Joshua, while captaining the whaler Ganges, sighted and named Gardner Island in the Phoenix Group in 1825, probably naming it after U.S. Congressman Gideon Gardner, the owner of Ganges.

Alternative sources claim the island was sighted by whaler Joshua Gardner, also reported to have captained Ganges in 1825.

== Reuben Coffin ==
Some sources report that in 1823 or 1824, a "Reuben Coffin" was captain of an American whaler named Transit, out of Nantucket, and was responsible for the discovery of the Bonin Islands. Anchoring unchallenged off Haha Jima, he claimed the islands for the United States, naming them "Coffin Islands".

== Owen Coffin ==
Owen Coffin (1802–1821) was a teenaged sailor aboard the Nantucket whaler Essex when it set sail for the Pacific Ocean on a sperm whaling expedition in August 1819. In November the next year, a whale rammed and breached their hull in mid-Pacific, causing Essex to sink. Following months in a small whaleboat, members of the near-starving crew finally concluded a member must be sacrificed. They drew lots, which Coffin lost, and he was shot and eaten.

== Various "Captain Coffins" ==
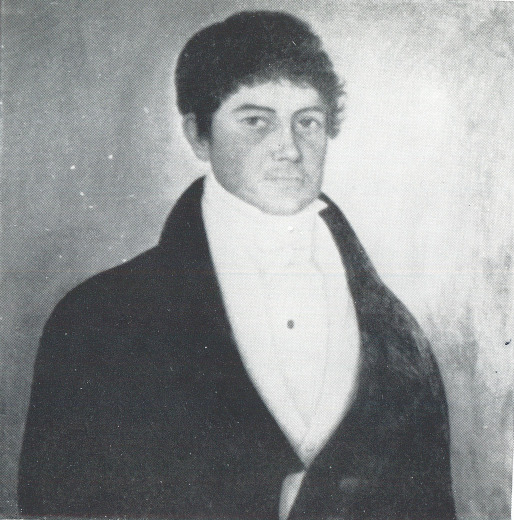
Portrait of Captain Abel Coffin (1792-1837), who was involved in bringing the original Siamese Twins to the West

- Captain Hezekiah Coffin commanded the first American ship to round Cape Horn. He also commanded a Nantucket whaler the Beaver, which, after conveying a load of whale oil to England and returning with a cargo of 112 chests of British East India Company tea, was one of three vessels in Boston Harbour (the others were Dartmouth and Eleanor) which had their cargoes dumped overboard during the Boston Tea Party on the night of December 16, 1773.
- A Captain Coffin was master of the whaler Baroness Longueville, sailing her on whaling voyage between August 1816 and July 1819, returning to Britain with 600 casks.
- A "Captain Coffin", master and part-owner of the Thule, Nantucket, after 27 months at sea, struck the "Booby Shoals" on Bellona Reefs, near the Chesterfield Islands on September 10, 1844, and was wrecked; the ship was carrying 1050 barrels of sperm oil. Two boats, manned by 16 men, managed to reach Moreton Bay, Queensland, on September 20, but a third boat was lost. Losing most of their possessions in the wreck, the sailors were replenished by Brisbane residents. Shipping lists show that Coffin, Mr. W. Thompson and 13 crew members took passage from Moreton Bay on the steamer Sovereign, departing October 4, and arriving in Port Jackson on October 8. Captain Coffin left Port Jackson on October 17 aboard the schooner Vanguard, bound for New Zealand.
- After Scotsman Robert Hunter discovered the original "Siamese twins" Chang and Eng in Siam in 1824, he partnered with Captain Abel Coffin to sail them to America in 1829. Abel continued touring with the twins, eventually buying out Hunter's share in the business venture. He later received letters from their manager James Hale.
- Records tell of Captain Seth Coffin, whose leg was badly injured in a whaling accident. With no surgeon on board, Coffin ordered his mate to cut off the leg with a knife, threatening to shoot him if he did not obey. He held the pistol pointing at the mate throughout the operation.

== Modern descendants ==
The Coffin family continued to be prominent in New England for many years. One modern descendant is David Coffin, a traditional folk musician from Gloucester, Massachusetts specializing in maritime and whaling-era music.

Another modern descendant is Carol Coffin. She was the final child to be raised in the Historic Coffin House.

== See also ==
- Jethro Coffin House
- Mary Coffin Starbuck, daughter of Tristram Coffin
- Coffin surname list
