= Thomas Coffin =

Thomas Coffin may refer to:

- Thomas Coffin (Lower Canada politician) (1762–1841), Canadian politician, member of the Legislative Assembly of Quebec
- Thomas Coffin (Nova Scotia politician) (1817–1890), Canadian politician, member of the Canadian House of Commons and the Receiver General
- Thomas C. Coffin (1887–1934), United States Representative from Idaho
