= Thomas Macy =

Settler of Amesbury and Nantucket, Massachusetts

Thomas Macy (1608–1682) was an early settler of the Massachusetts Bay Colony and of Nantucket Island. He was born in Chilmark, Wiltshire, came over to the Massachusetts Bay Colony in 1635, and lived at various times in Newbury and Salisbury before becoming a founder of the town of Amesbury, Massachusetts. He married Sarah Hopcott (1612–1706) in 1643. He served as Amesbury's first town clerk; he held many town offices, including those of school overseer and deputy to the Massachusetts General Court, and was involved in numerous land transactions. While in Amesbury, he built and lived in the Macy-Colby House, today a listed historic building. Unlike many other early settlers of Massachusetts, he was a Baptist rather than a Puritan.

He left Amesbury in 1659 after years of conflict with local Puritan leaders, including being fined 30 shillings for providing shelter to Quakers during a rainstorm in 1657. He was among the first group of European settlers to establish his family on the island of Nantucket (then a part of the colony of New York); he, Tristram Coffin and other settlers purchased the land from the Native Americans. In 1671, Macy and Coffin were selected as spokesmen for the settlers, going to New York in 1671 to meet with Governor Francis Lovelace and secure their claim to Nantucket. Macy ultimately rose to the position of Chief Magistrate. The island soon became a haven for Quakers, and many of Macy's descendants were raised in the Quaker faith (his wife Sarah converted to the faith following his death). Macy became the subject of a poem by the 19th-century Quaker poet John Greenleaf Whittier entitled "The Exiles", depicting the plight of Quakers in the religiously intolerant Puritan society of colonial Massachusetts.

Entrepreneur R. H. Macy and actor William H. Macy are among his descendants.
