= Mary Coffin Starbuck =

American minister (1645–1717)

Mary Coffin Starbuck (February 20, 1645 – late 1717) was a Quaker leader from the Massachusetts Bay Colony. She and her husband, Nathaniel Starbuck, were the first English couple to marry on Nantucket and were parents to the first white child born on the island. She supported her husband's efforts to run a trading post, which grew into a large mercantile business with the advent of the whaling trade. Unusual for the time, she was a prominent leader in civic and religious matters. She had ten children and her family members were leaders in the Quaker meeting.

== Early life ==
Born on February 20, 1645, in Haverhill, Massachusetts Bay Colony, (Note: She is also said to have been born on February 2, 1645 but her birth record shows it was on the 20th of the month. A record also shows that she was born in Nantucket.) Mary Coffin was the youngest daughter of Tristram Coffin (1605–1681) and Dionis Stevens (died after 1682). Her parents and her five older siblings emigrated from Brixton, England in 1642 to the Massachusetts Bay Colony. Her father's two unmarried sisters and widowed mother came with them.

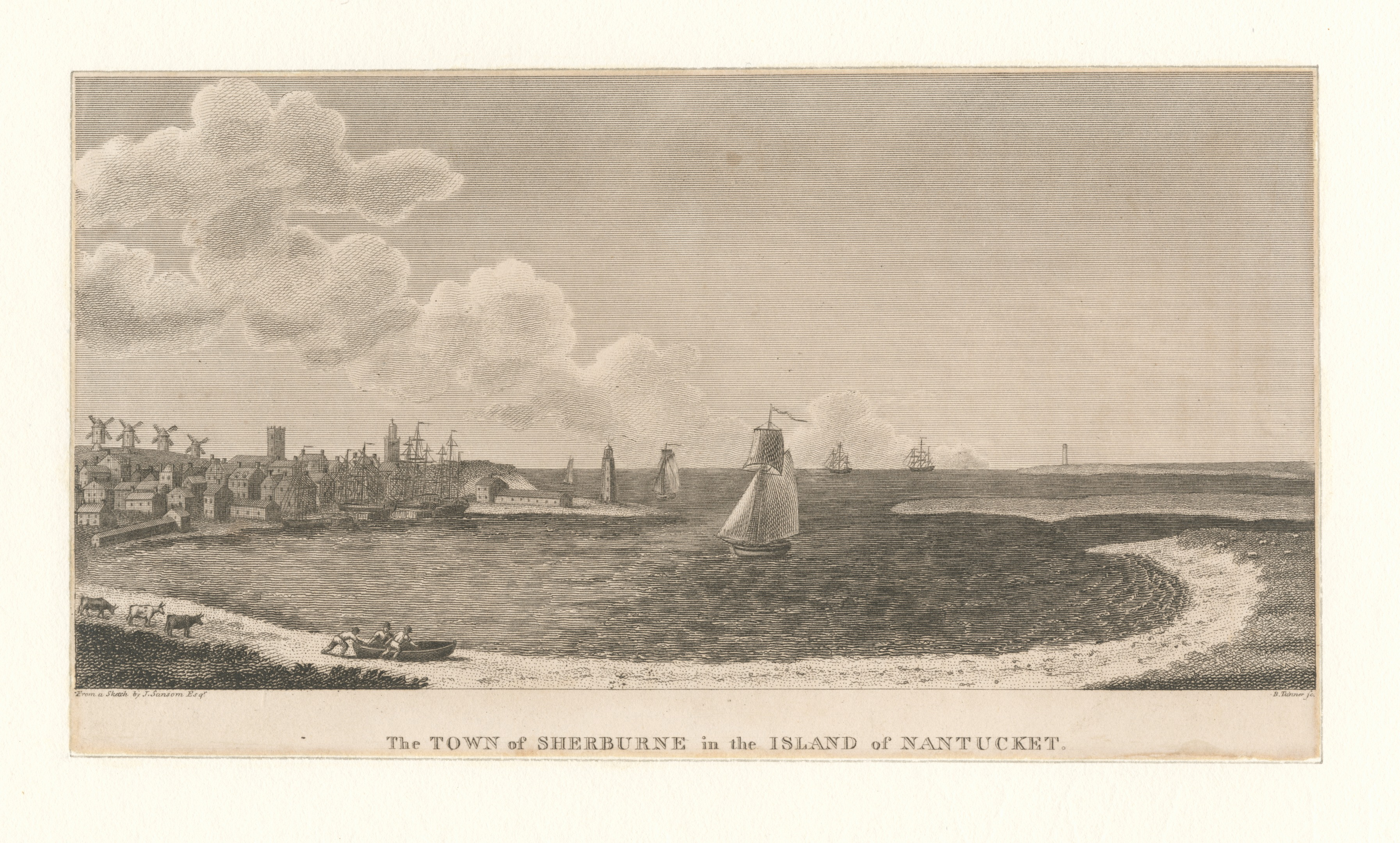
The town on Nantucket Island, when it was still called Sherburne, in 1775

She moved with her family to Nantucket when she was about 15 years of age. Her father, called the "patriarch of Nantucket", was one of the original English proprietors of the settlement, and he was the island's first chief magistrate. With his sons, Tristram owned all of Tuckernuck Island and one quarter of Nantucket. Over the course of his life, he gave land to his children, including Mary and her husband after their marriage. She inherited her business and civil prowess from her father. She was baptized at Waiputequat or Waqutaquaib Pond by Peter Folger and had "radical religious leanings". Folger, a Baptist, was the maternal grandfather of Benjamin Franklin.

== Marriage and children ==
In 1662, Mary Coffin was married at 17 years of age to Nathaniel Starbuck, son of one of the original Nantucket proprietors, Edward Starbuck and his wife, Katherine (Reynolds) Starbuck. Upon her marriage, she became Mary Starbuck. They were the first English couple to marry on Nantucket. Their first of ten children was the first white baby born on Nantucket. Their children were: Mary, Elizabeth, Nathaniel, Jethro, Barnabas, Eunice, Priscilla, Hepzibah, Ann, and Paul.

The Starbucks had two and a half shares in the Nantucket settlement. She was the leader in the family; her husband had legal issues early in their marriage and he could not read or write. They lived by Hummock Pond at Parliament House, so named for its large main room that was used for town and religious meetings (Note: Once the harbor was moved to another part of Nantucket, most of the houses in this area were removed.) and because a lot of public business was performed there.

== Colonial Nantucket ==
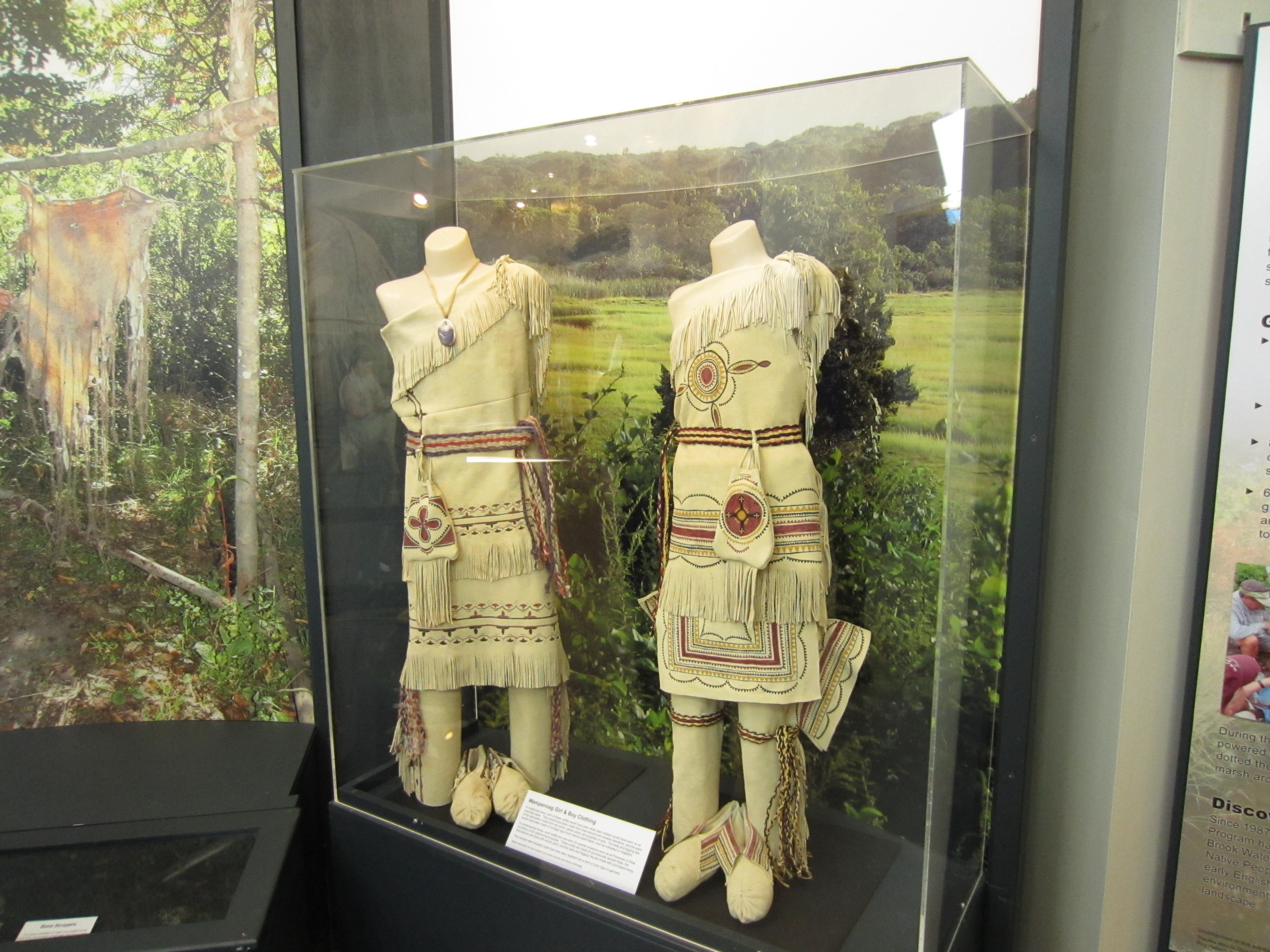
Wampanoag traded with the Starbucks to purchase notions for making clothes.

Nathaniel operated a trading post, bartering goods with the Wampanoag, and Mary performed the bookkeeping. (Note: Her record book, from the days when the business traded with native people is among the collection of the Nantucket Historical Association.) Initially, Native people hunted birds and fished for their livelihood, and traded fish and bird feathers for goods. As the settlement of Europeans was established, Native Americans adopted the agricultural economy. The mercantile business expanded with the advent of the whaling industry and supplied residents with items such as candles, clothing, fabric, notions, molasses, and knives. The Starbuck business was likely at the south side of Main Street and warehouse was located southeast of the Main and Union Street intersection.

During the Half-Share Revolt, she ensured that she and her husband supported her father and not Nathaniel's father, Edward Starbuck. During local meetings, she prefaced her comments with "My husband and I, having considered the subject,...". Her opinion was well-respected within the settlement.

He [Nathaniel] appeared not a Man of mean Parts, but she [Mary] so far exceeded him in soundness of Judgment, clearness of Understanding, and an elegant way of expressing herself, and that not in an affected Strain, but very natural to her, that it tended to lessen the Qualifications of her Husband.

— John Richardson, Quaker missionary

Known as "the great woman" or the "great Mary Starbuck", she was unique among women of her time and was a model to Nantucket of a stalwart person who embraced the Quaker religion, while also achieving success in business. Women in Nantucket were treated in many ways as equals. When their husbands left on whaling trips, women were responsible for the business that was conducted on the island.

== Quaker religion ==
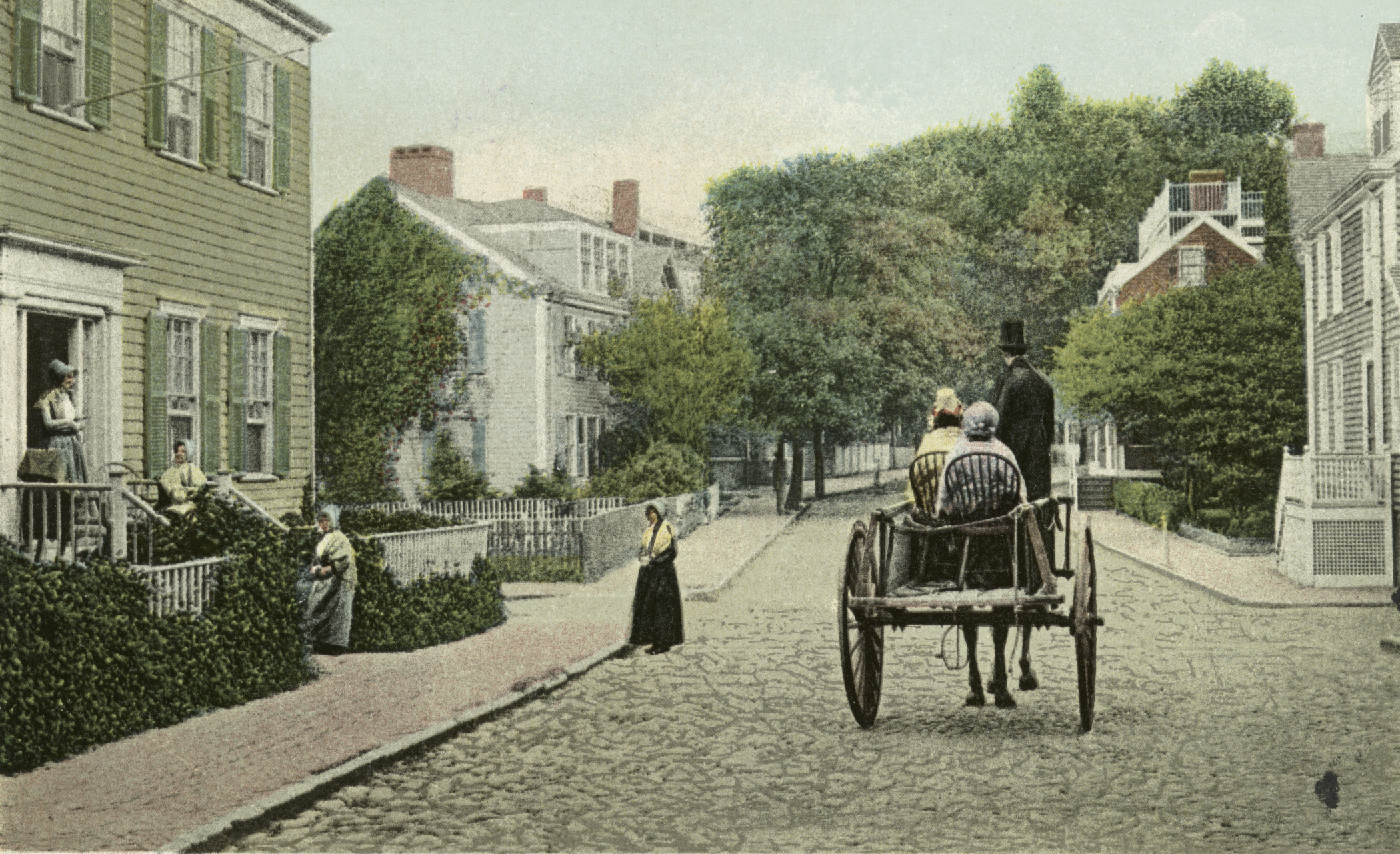
Nantucket Shearing Cart and Quakers, Nantucket, Massachusetts

Like Quakers, Starbuck did not believe that services led by ministers and convinced her community members not to install a minister at Nantucket for many years. According to author Nathaniel Philbrick, "it was said that not of consequence was done on Nantucket without Mary's approval.

Converted by Quaker missionary John Richardson and Thomas Story, Starbuck established the Quaker congregation in Nantucket, first meeting in her house beginning in 1701 or 1702. She became a member of the Society of Friends (Quakers) in 1704 and became a church leader and preacher. She was the first Quaker from Nantucket to preach on the island.

As compared to other religions of the time, the Quaker religion was based upon members finding their own Inner Light (rather than relying on ministers to interpret scripture) and was favorable to women, who could write about religion, preach, or prosthelytize. She converted hundreds of people to the Society of Friends and the group established a meeting house on the island in 1708. Men and women from her family assumed leadership roles.

According to Thomas Story, a noted Quaker, she was "in great reputation throughout the island for her knowledge in matters of religion, and an oracle among them on that account."

== Death and legacy ==
Starbuck died in late 1717, (Note: There are a number of dates of death, starting with September 13, as well as November 13 and December 13 of 1717.) and she is buried at the Friends Burial Ground in Nantucket. Nathaniel died about one and a half years later, on the second day of the second month or June 6, 1719. Her family members became active members of the Society of Friends, continuing the faith for at least 200 years. Lucretia Mott was one of her descendants.
