= Charles L. Coffin =

American inventor

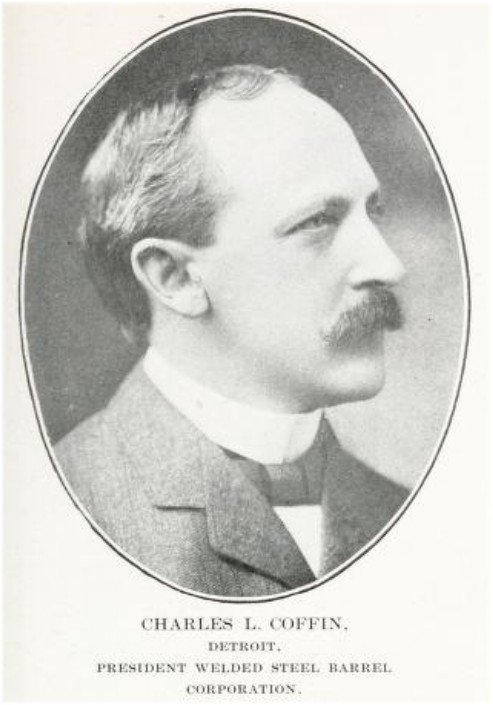
Charles L. Coffin

Charles L. Coffin (1844-1926) was an American inventor from Detroit. He was awarded U.S. patent 428,459 for an arc welding process using a metal electrode. This was the first time that metal melted from the electrode carried across the arc to deposit filler metal in the joint to make a weld. Two years earlier, Nikolay Slavyanov presented the same idea of transferring metal across an arc, but to cast metal in a mold.
