= John Coffin (scientist) =

American virologist

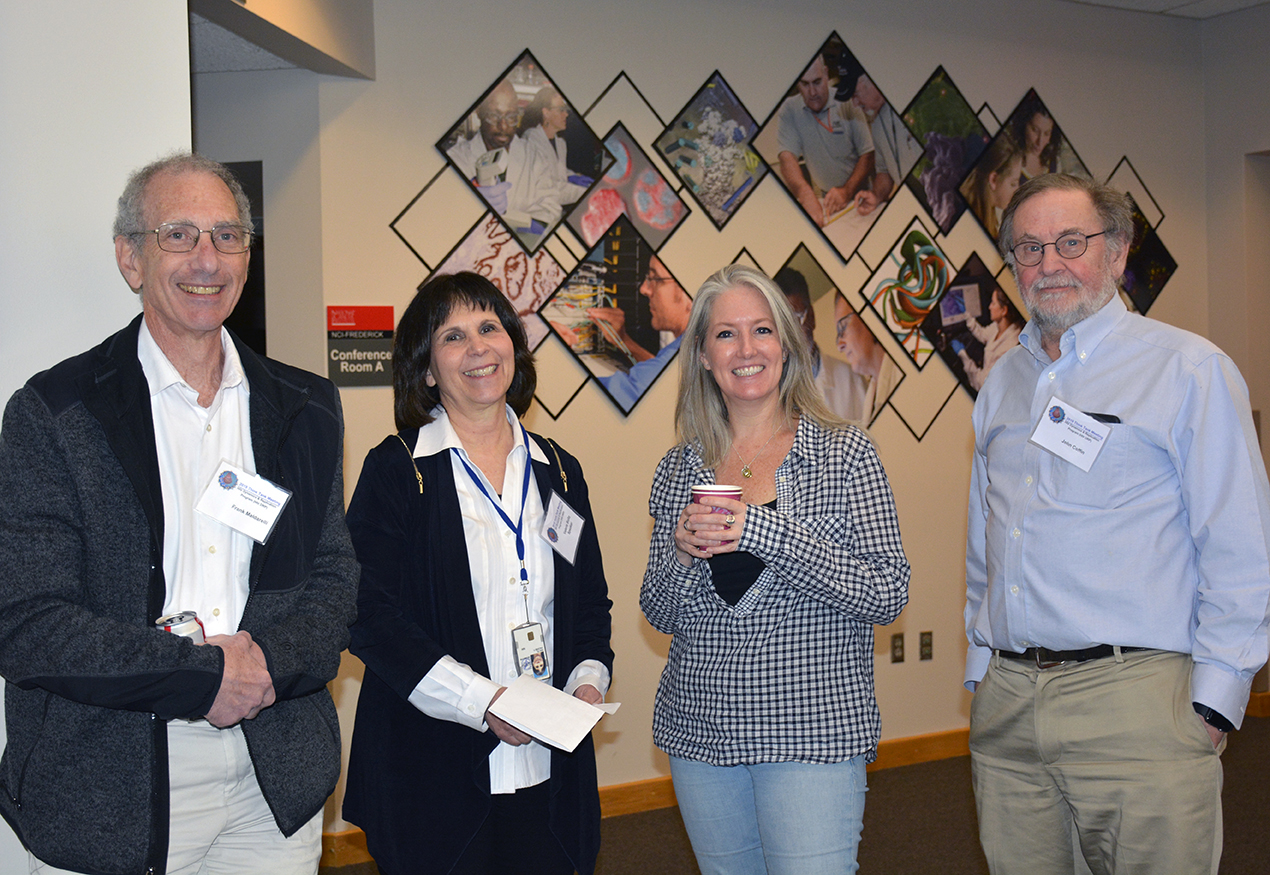
Coffin, Mary Kearney, and colleagues at the 2019 HIV DRP Think Tank Meeting.

John Coffin is an American virologist. Born in Boston, Massachusetts, raised in Schenectady, New York, Coffin is a professor of Molecular Biology and Microbiology at Tufts University in Boston. He is also the former director of the HIV Dynamics and Replication Program (formerly the Drug Resistance Program) of the National Cancer Institute (NCI) and serves as special advisor to the director of the Center for Cancer Research at NCI. He is a member of the National Academy of Sciences (elected in 1999) and a recipient of American Cancer Society professorship. He has advised policy committees at the national level regarding retrovirus-related matters. Coffin was programme committee chair for the 18th Conference on Retroviruses and Opportunistic Infections in 2011.

Coffin received his undergraduate degree from Wesleyan University. He performed PhD research with the geneticist Howard Temin at the University of Wisconsin. His postdoctoral advisor was Charles Weissmann of the University of Zürich. Coffin began his faculty appointment at Tufts in 1975. Coffin's HIV/AIDS research reflects his interests in molecular biology, virus-host relationships, pathogenesis and viral evolution and population dynamics.
