= Tristram Coffin (settler) =

Early American migrant (1609–1681)

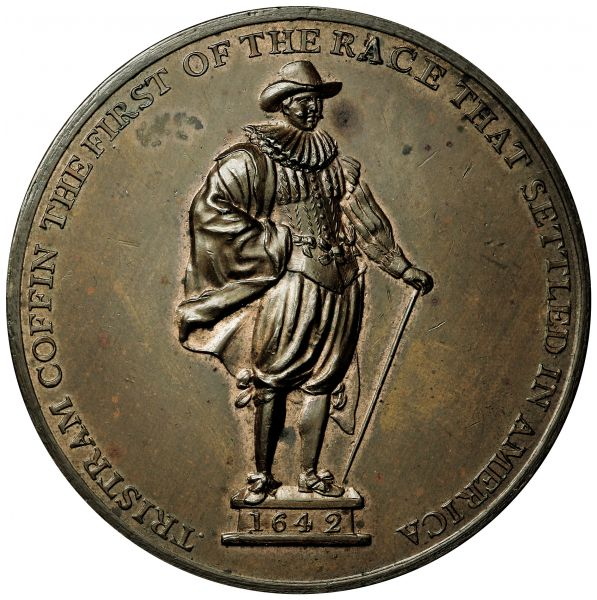
- 1827 medal depicting Tristram Coffin
- Born: Tristram Coffyn; 11 March 1609; Brixton, Devon
- Died: 2 October 1681 (aged 72); Nantucket
- Occupations: Farmer and magistrate
- Known for: Purchase of Nantucket

Tristram Coffin (or Coffyn) (Note: Tristram always spelled his name "Coffyn" but his descendants used "Coffin" as do most sources on his life) (c. 1609 – 2 October 1681) was an immigrant to Massachusetts from England. He came to the Massachusetts colony with his family in 1642. In 1659 he led a group of investors that bought Nantucket from Thomas Mayhew for thirty pounds and two beaver hats. He became a prominent citizen of the settlement. Many descendants became prominent and wealthy in North American society when they participated in the whaling industry and facilitated the triangle trade. Some descendants became loyalists and migrated to Canada. Other descendants migrated away from colonial America's eastern seaports and settled in Quaker communities in places such as North Carolina. While some descendants were engaged in the slave trade and illegally smuggling slaves into the US or Canada after the international slave trade was banned in 1808, others were leading influential anti-slavery and abolitionist movements in multiple states across the country. Some Coffins were involved in the later history of Nantucket during and after its heyday as a whaling center. Almost all notable Americans with roots in Nantucket are descended from Tristram Coffin, although Benjamin Franklin was an exception.

== England, 1605–1642 ==
Tristram Coffin Sr. was born to Peter and Joanna (Kember) Coffin and baptized in the parish of Brixton near Plymouth, England, on 11 March 1609–10. He was raised on the family farm in Butlas (now But Las) parish. belonged to the landed gentry. He married Dionis Stevens in 1630 and they were to have nine children, the first five born in England. Coffin was a Brixton church warden from 1639 to 1640, and was a constable in 1641.

Charles I inherited the throne of England in 1625 and initiated a long struggle with his parliament, which wanted to abolish bishops from the House of Lords and limit the king's powers. Things came to a head when Charles raised his royal standard at Nottingham in August 1642, and England soon descended into Civil War (1642–1651). Tristram Coffin's brother John received a mortal wound at Plymouth fort, although it is not known exactly when or even which side he was fighting on. Perhaps for reasons associated with these political upheavals, Tristram Coffin decided to leave his farm in England and emigrate to the new world.

== Massachusetts, 1642–1659 ==
Tristram Coffin sailed to Boston in 1642 with his wife and children, his two sisters and his mother. For a short time he ran an inn in Salisbury, Massachusetts. He then moved to the new settlement of Pentucket, now Haverhill, Massachusetts. His name appears on a deed dated 15 November 1642 recording the sale of the land for the settlement by the local American Indian people. He is said to have used a plow that he had made himself to cultivate the land. It was here that his last four children were born.

In 1648 he left the farm and moved to Newbury, Massachusetts. Here he operated a ferry across the Merrimack River and he and his wife ran a tavern. In 1653 his wife was "presented" for selling beer above the legal price of two pennies per quart. However, she was acquitted when it was found that her beer was much stronger than the ordinary. Coffin sold the inn and ferry in 1654 or 1655 and moved to Salisbury, Massachusetts, where he signed himself "Tristram Coffyn, Commissioner of Salisbury".

== Nantucket, 1659–1681 ==
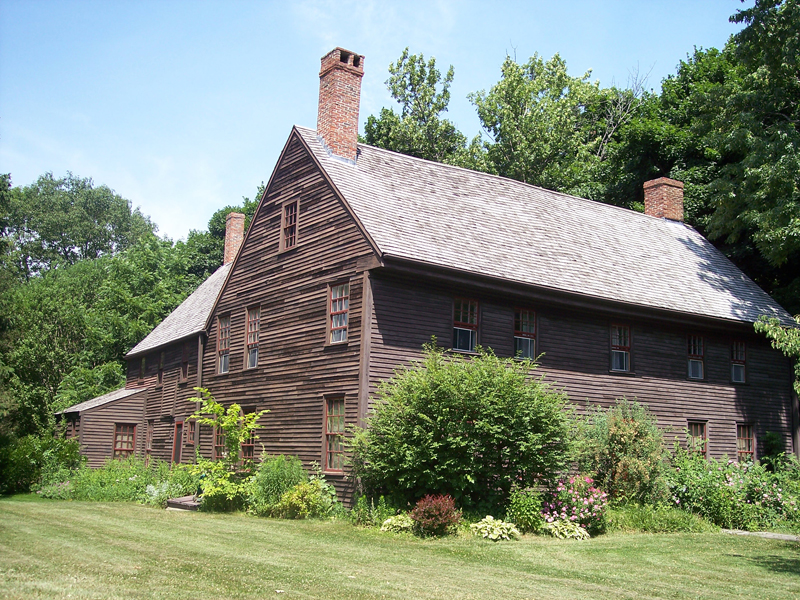
Tristram Coffin Jr. House, built in Newbury circa 1678

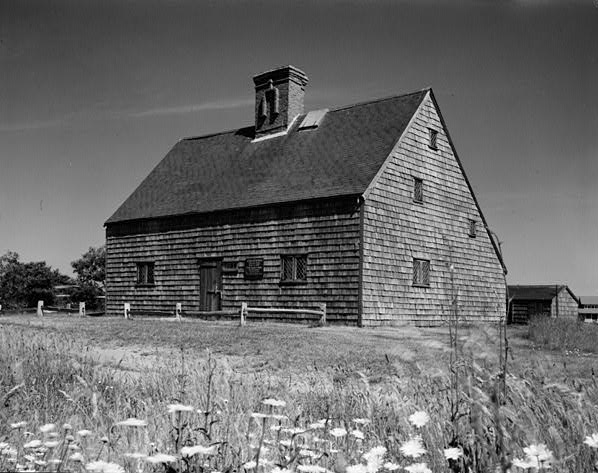
Jethro Coffin House, built in 1686 for Jethro Coffin, Tristam Coffin's grandson, and now the oldest house on Nantucket

Tristram Coffin and other Salisbury investors, including Christopher Hussey, bought Nantucket island from Thomas Mayhew on July 2, 1659. The purchase price was 30 pounds plus two beaver hats made by his son, also called Tristram. Coffin was the prime mover of the enterprise and was given first choice of land. In 1659 he settled near the western end of the island near Capaum pond. His sons Peter Coffin, Tristram Coffin Junior and James Coffin also received land on the island. Soon after settling, Tristram Coffin purchased the thousand-acre Tuckernuck Island at the western end of Nantucket. On 10 May 1660 the sachems conveyed title to a large part of the island to Coffin and his associates for eighty pounds. He built a corn mill in which he employed many of the local Native Americans, and he employed others on his farm.

In 1671 Coffin and Thomas Macy were selected as spokesmen for the colonists, going to New York in 1671 to meet with Governor Francis Lovelace and secure their claim to Nantucket. As the most wealthy and respected of the colonists, Coffin was appointed chief magistrate of Nantucket on 29 June 1671. After a period where Macy served as Chief magistrate, in 1677 Coffin was again appointed chief magistrate for a term of four years.

== Legacy ==
Coat of Arms of Tristram Coffin

Tristram Coffin died on 2 October 1681 at the age of 72. During the years before his death, he had bestowed much of his property on his children and grandchildren. At his death he left seven children, 60 grandchildren and several great-grandchildren. One of his grandchildren calculated that by the year 1728, the number of his descendants was 1582, of whom 1128 were still alive.

Several of his descendants achieved prominence. His daughter Mary Coffin Starbuck became a leader in introducing Quaker practices into Nantucket. A grandson, James Coffin, was the first of the Coffins to enter into the whaling business. A poem by Thomas Worth written in 1763 says six Captains named Coffin were sailing out of Nantucket. Sir Isaac Coffin, 1st Baronet (1759–1839) served during the American Revolutionary War and the Napoleonic Wars and became an admiral in the British Royal Navy. He founded a school on the island in 1827 to educate descendants of Tristram Coffin – which included almost all the children on the island – with emphasis on nautical skills. Lucretia Coffin Mott (1793–1880) was a Quaker born on Nantucket, who became a prominent abolitionist and women's rights activist. She helped write the Declaration of Sentiments during the Seneca Falls Convention in 1848, and will be included on the back of the U.S. $10 bill to be newly designed by 2020.

Some branches of the Coffin family were prominent in New England, grouped among the so-called Boston Brahmins. Elizabeth Coffin, daughter of a wealthy merchant from Nantucket, was mother of the prominent Massachusetts industrialists Henry Coffin Nevins and David Nevins Jr. Charles A. Coffin (1844–1926) born in Somerset, Massachusetts, became co-founder and first President of General Electric corporation. Some retained the family links to Nantucket after the whaling industry had collapsed and many people had left the island. In the eighth generation, Elizabeth Coffin (1850–1930), an artist, educator and Quaker philanthropist, was known for her paintings of Nantucket and for helping revive Sir Isaac Coffin's school with a new emphasis on crafts. Among the ninth generation, Robert P. T. Coffin (1892–1955) was an American poet who won the Pulitzer Prize in 1936 for his book of collected poems called Strange Holiness. One modern descendant is David Coffin, a traditional folk musician from Gloucester, Massachusetts specializing in maritime and whaling-era music.

== See also ==
- Coffin (whaling family)
- Coffin (surname)
- Dr. Nathaniel Coffin, a descendant of Coffin
