= Tapio Schneider =

- Born: 1972 (age 53–54); Germany
- Citizenship: German, American, Finnish
- Known for: Climate Modeling Alliance (CliMA); Stratocumulus cloud breakup Earth System Modeling 2.0
- Awards: Jule G. Charney Award (2025); Packard Fellow (2005)
- Scientific career
- Fields: Atmospheric science, Climate dynamics, Fluid dynamics
- Workplaces: California Institute of Technology; Google Research; NASA Jet Propulsion Laboratory; ETH Zurich
- Doctoral advisor: Isaac Held
- Website: climate-dynamics.org

Tapio Schneider (born 1972) is a German-American climate scientist and physicist. He is the Theodore Y. Wu Professor of Environmental Science and Engineering at the California Institute of Technology (Caltech) and a Principal Scientist at Google Research. He is best known for his work on atmospheric turbulence, the dynamics of clouds, and for leading the Climate Modeling Alliance (CliMA), a multi-institutional initiative to develop a new Earth system model that uses machine learning to improve climate predictions.

== Education ==
Schneider studied physics at the University of Freiburg in Germany, receiving his Vordiplom in 1993. He was a visiting graduate student at the University of Washington from 1994 to 1995. He earned his Ph.D. in Atmospheric and Oceanic Sciences from Princeton University in 2001 under the supervision of Isaac Held.

== Career ==
Schneider joined the faculty of Caltech in 2002. He served as the Frank J. Gilloon Professor from 2010 to 2018 before being named the Theodore Y. Wu Professor. From 2013 to 2016, he held a position as Professor of Climate Dynamics at ETH Zurich. He was a Senior Research Scientist at the NASA Jet Propulsion Laboratory from 2017 to 2024. In 2022, he joined Google Research as a Visiting Researcher, becoming a Principal Scientist in 2024.

== Climate Modeling Alliance (CliMA) ==
Schneider leads the Climate Modeling Alliance (CliMA), a coalition of scientists and engineers from Caltech, MIT, and the Jet Propulsion Laboratory.

=== Mission and Approach ===
The project's primary mission is to reduce and quantify uncertainties in climate projections—specifically those arising from small-scale processes such as clouds, turbulence, and convection—by building a new Earth System Model (ESM). The alliance operates on a blueprint proposed by Schneider and colleagues in 2017 termed "Earth System Modeling 2.0". This approach integrates data assimilation and machine learning (ML) directly into the model's physics. Unlike traditional models that are manually tuned, the CliMA model is designed to automatically learn subgrid-scale (SGS) closures from diverse data sources, including global satellite observations and targeted high-resolution large-eddy simulations (LES).

=== Technology and Software ===
The CliMA model is notable for being written entirely in the Julia programming language, chosen for its ability to solve the "two-language problem" by offering both high-level abstraction and high-performance machine code generation. The software stack is designed to run on both CPUs and GPUs.

== Research ==
Schneider's research focuses on the large-scale dynamics of the atmosphere and climate change.

- Cloud Dynamics: He has investigated the instability of stratocumulus decks, proposing that high CO_{2} concentrations (above 1,200 ppm) could trigger a breakup of these clouds, leading to abrupt global warming of up to 8°C.
- General Circulation: His work on the Hadley cell and Intertropical Convergence Zone (ITCZ) has clarified how energy transport regulates tropical precipitation belts.
- Extreme Weather: He studies the physics of climate extremes, showing how thermodynamic and dynamic factors influence the frequency of heavy precipitation and heatwaves.

== Awards and Honors ==
- 2025: Jule G. Charney Medal, American Meteorological Society
- 2025: Fellow, American Meteorological Society
- 2022: Fellow, American Geophysical Union
- 2019: Rosenstiel Award, University of Miami
- 2008: Discover Magazine, “20 Best Brains Under 40”
- 2005-2010: David and Lucile Packard Fellow
- 2004-2006: Alfred P. Sloan Foundation, Research Fellow
- 2004 James R. Holton Junior Scientist Award, American Geophysical Union

== Selected Publications ==
=== Books ===
- Schneider, Tapio; Sobel, Adam H., eds. (2007). The Global Circulation of the Atmosphere. Princeton University Press. ISBN 978-0-691-12181-9.
- Venaille, Antoine; Bouchet, Freddy; Schneider, Tapio; Salomon, Christophe, eds. (2020). Fundamental Aspects of Turbulent Flows in Climate Dynamics. Oxford University Press. ISBN 978-0198855217.

=== Selected Articles ===
- Schneider, Tapio; et al. (2023). "Harnessing AI and computing to advance climate modelling and prediction". Nature Climate Change. 13: 887–889. doi:10.1038/s41558-023-01769-3. hdl:11585/941359.
- Schneider, Tapio; Kaul, Colleen M.; Pressel, Kyle G. (2019). "Possible climate transitions from breakup of stratocumulus decks under greenhouse warming". Nature Geoscience. 12: 163–167. doi:10.1038/s41561-019-0310-1.
- Schneider, Tapio; Teixeira, Joao; Bretherton, Christopher S.; Brient, Florent; Pressel, Kyle G.; Schär, Christoph; Siebesma, A. Pier (2017). "Climate goals and computing the future of clouds". Nature Climate Change. 7: 3–5. doi:10.1038/nclimate3190.
- Schneider, Tapio; Bischoff, Tobias; Haug, Gerald H. (2014). "Migrations and dynamics of the intertropical convergence zone". Nature. 513: 45–53. doi:10.1038/nature13636.
