= Isaac Held =

American meteorologist (born 1948)

Isaac M. Held
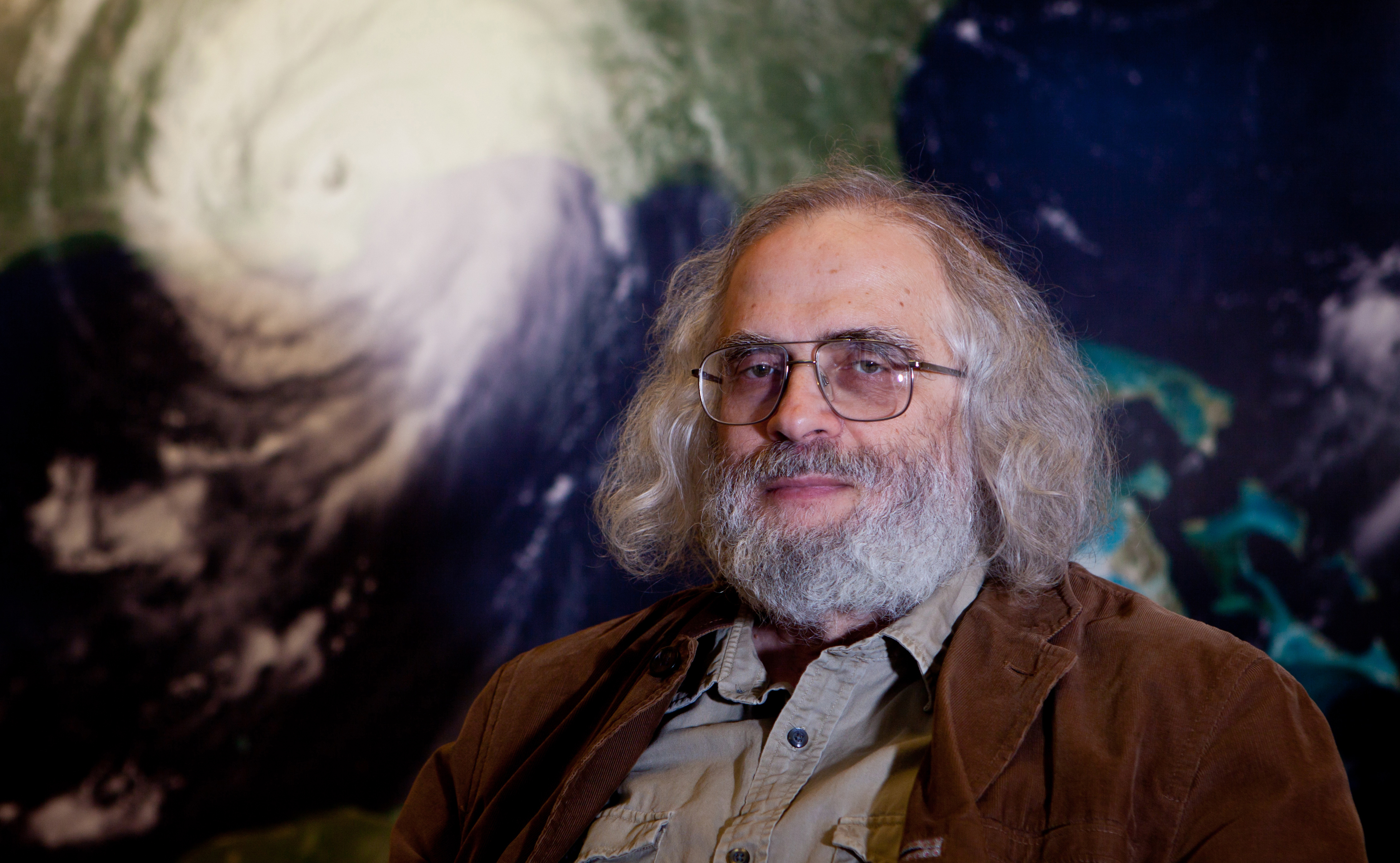
- Isaac Held
- Born: October 23, 1948; Ulm, Germany
- Education: University of Minnesota, B.S.; State University of New York at Stony Brook, M.A.; Princeton University, Ph.D.
- Children: 1
- Scientific career
- Fields: Geophysical fluid dynamics
- Doctoral advisor: Syukuro Manabe
- Doctoral students: Prashant D. Sardeshmukh; Sukyoung Lee; Olivier Pauluis; Tapio Schneider; Sarah Kang

Isaac Meyer Held (born October 23, 1948) is an American meteorologist. He is a retired senior research scientist at the Geophysical Fluid Dynamics Laboratory. Held was elected to the United States National Academy of Sciences in 2003.

== Biography ==
Born to refugee parents in Ulm, Germany in 1948, Held came to Minnesota with his family at the age of 4. His father died when he was only eight and he and his brother, Herman, were raised by his mother Bertha, a Holocaust survivor who worked as a seamstress. Held did his undergraduate work in physics at the University of Minnesota, Minneapolis in 1969 and started a graduate program in theoretical physics at the State University of New York at Stony Brook. Isaac and his wife, Joann, have one son, Joshua. While there, he discovered climate science which led to his transferring to the Atmospheric and Oceanic Sciences Program at Princeton University, where he completed his Ph.D. in 1976 under the supervision of Syukuro Manabe. After a brief stint as a postdoctoral fellow at Harvard University, Held returned to Princeton to join the Geophysical Fluid Dynamics Laboratory in 1978, as well as teaching in the Atmospheric and Oceanic Sciences (AOS) Program at Princeton. He retired from the GFDL and teaching in 2020, but retains an affiliation with AOS, as a Senior Scholar, Program in Atmospheric and Oceanic Sciences.

== Research ==
Held's research has had two major themes. The first is understanding how the Earth's climate responds to changes in the amount of solar radiation hitting the planet or to the concentration of greenhouse gasses in the atmosphere. His early work highlighted the importance of the lapse rate in determining the climate's response to radiation changes. Held has continued to be concerned with how global warming can alter both the cycle of water and the distribution of winds on Earth. In a paper published in 2006 with Brian Soden, he showed that this increase in precipitation might nonetheless be associated with a slowdown of the Walker circulation.

The second theme of Held's research is the general circulation of the atmosphere. In one of his earliest papers, he showed that when a region is unstable to the large-scale planetary waves known as Rossby waves, the propagation of waves out of this region results in an easterly (westward) acceleration, which generates jet streams in midlatitudes. In contrast, regions in which these waves break experience an eastward (westerly) acceleration. Held also developed a theory for the Hadley circulation that would exist in the absence of atmospheric turbulence.

== Awards and honors ==
- 1987: Clarence Leroy Meisinger Award, American Meteorological Society
- 1991: Fellow, American Meteorological Society
- 1995: Fellow, American Geophysical Union
- 2003: Elected to the United States National Academy of Sciences
- 2005: NOAA Presidential Rank Award
- 2008: Carl-Gustaf Rossby Research Medal, American Meteorological Society
- 2011: BBVA Foundation Frontiers of Knowledge Award of Climate Change for his fundamental and pioneering contributions to our understanding of the structure of atmospheric circulation systems, and the role of water vapor – the most important greenhouse gas – in Climate Change.
- 2018: Roger Revelle Medal, American Geophysical Union

== See also ==
- Held-Hou Model
