= Held–Hou Model =

1980 model used to explain and analyze the Hadley circulation

The Held–Hou Model is a model for the Hadley circulation of the atmosphere that would exist in the absence of atmospheric turbulence. The model was developed by Isaac Held and Arthur Hou in 1980.

The essence of the model is that air rising from the surface at the equator conserves its angular momentum as it moves poleward. This distribution of wind, in turn, determines the distribution of temperature, which determines the latitudinal extent of the circulation by requiring energy conservation. This stands in contrast to George Hadley's original conception of the circulation, which he argued reached the poles. The Hadley circulation has a cooling effect at and near the equator and a warming effect at higher latitudes within the Hadley cell. This energy transport can be converted into a mass transport, to determine the strength of the circulation, by normalizing by the appropriate vertical stability. The effects of moisture and seasons on the model have been studied.

Earth's atmosphere violates the underlying assumptions of the model: angular momentum is not conserved and the tropical atmosphere is not energetically closed. As such, the Held–Hou model is a conceptual model that does not make quantitatively accurate predictions of the sensitivity of the Hadley circulation to changes in atmospheric parameters.
