= Subtropics =

Geographic and climate zone

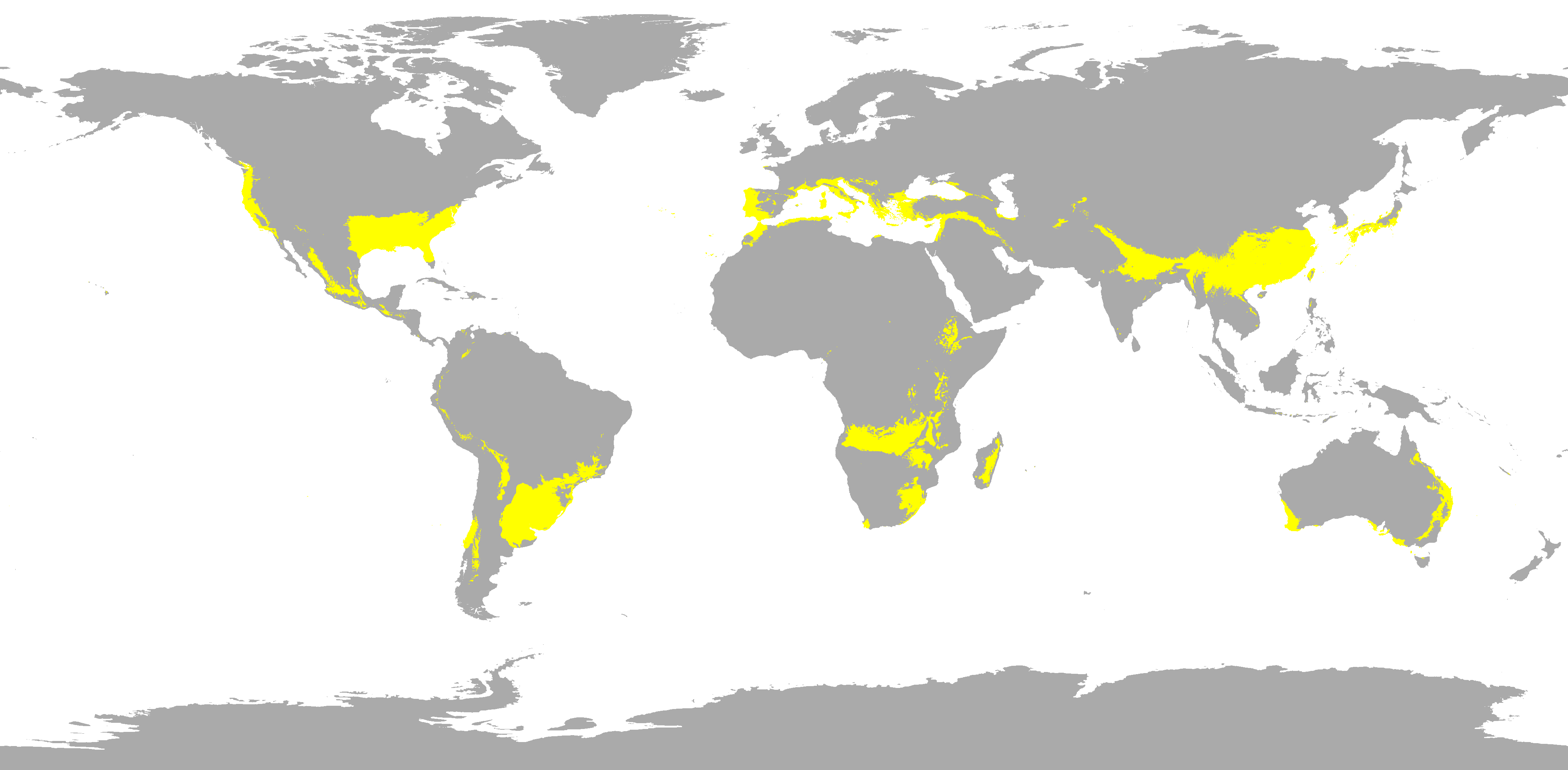
Areas of the world with subtropical climates

The subtropical zones or subtropics are geographical and climate zones immediately to the north and south of the tropics. Geographically part of the temperate zones of both hemispheres, they cover the middle latitudes from 23°26′09.0″ (or 23.43583°) to approximately 35° to 40° north and south. The horse latitudes lie within this range.

Subtropical climates are often characterized by hot summers and mild winters with infrequent frost. Most subtropical climates fall into two basic types: humid subtropical (Köppen climate classification: Cfa/Cwa), where rainfall is often concentrated in the warmest months, for example Southeast China and the Southeastern United States, and dry summer or Mediterranean climate (Köppen climate classification: Csa/Csb), where seasonal rainfall is concentrated in the cooler months, such as the Mediterranean Basin or California.

Subtropical climates can also occur at high elevations within the tropics, such as in the southern end of the Mexican Plateau and in Da Lat of the Vietnamese Central Highlands. The six climate classifications use the term to help define the various temperature and precipitation regimes for planet Earth.

A great portion of the world's deserts are within the subtropics, as this is where the semi-permanent subtropical anticyclone resides (typically inland on the southwest sides of continents). Areas bordering warm oceans (typically on the southeast sides of continents) have hot and wet summers with frequent (but brief) convective rainfall (tropical cyclones can also contribute to annual rainfall). Areas bordering cool oceans (typically on the southwest sides of continents) are prone to fog, aridity, and dry summers. Plants such as palms, citrus, mango, pistachio, lychee, and avocado are grown in the subtropics.

== Definition ==
The tropics have been historically defined as lying between the Tropic of Cancer and Tropic of Capricorn, at latitudes 23°26′09.0″ (or 23.43583°) north and south, respectively. According to the American Meteorological Society, the poleward fringe of the subtropics is at latitudes approximately 35° north and south, respectively.

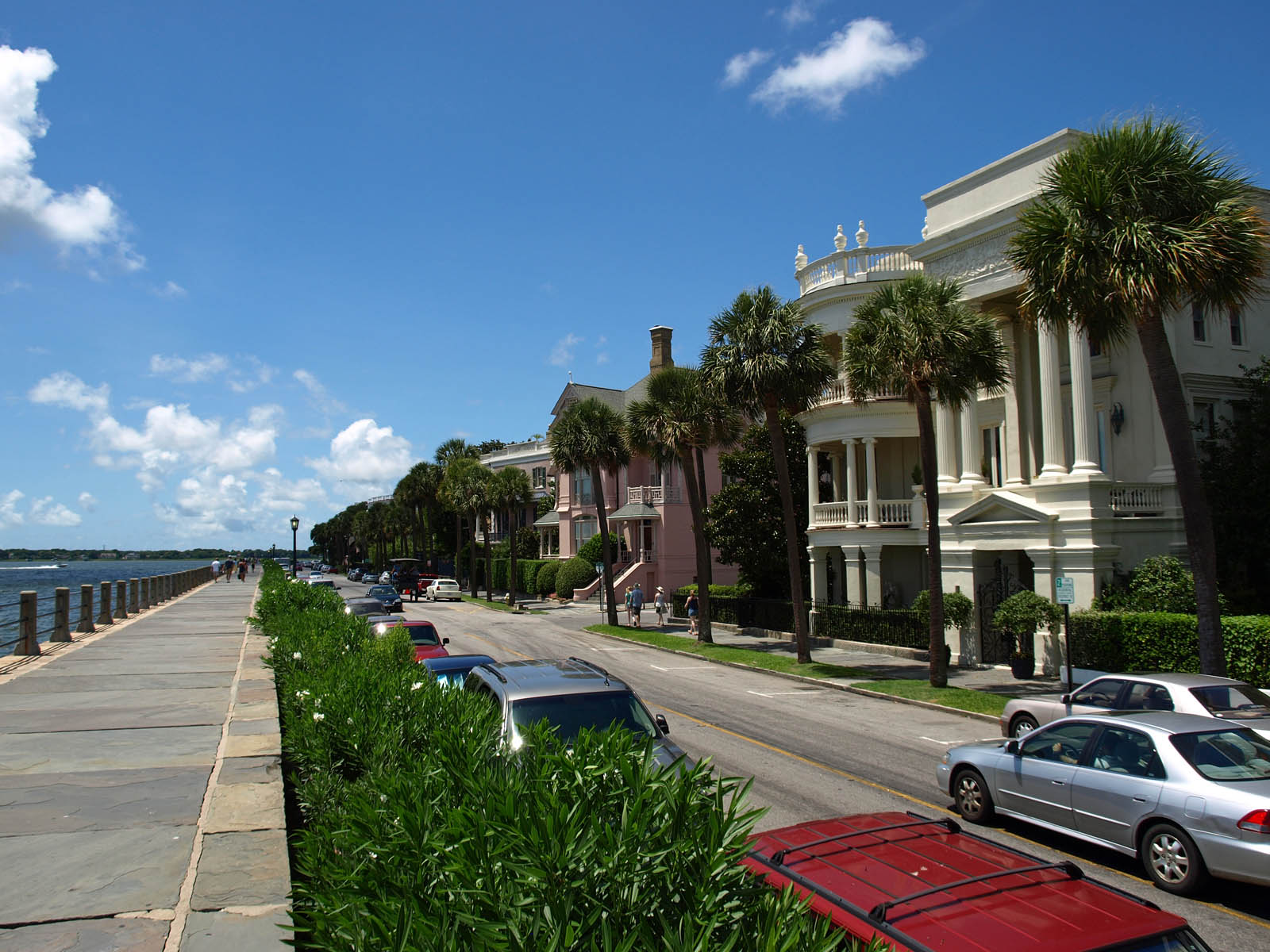
Houses in subtropical Charleston, South Carolina, along The Battery

Several methods have been used to define the subtropical climate depending on the climate system used.

The most well known is the Trewartha climate classification, which defines a subtropical region as one that has at least eight months with a mean temperature greater than 10 °C (50.0 °F) and at least one month with a mean temperature under 18 °C (64.4 °F).

German climatologists Carl Troll and Karlheinz Paffen defined warm temperate zones as plain and hilly lands having an average temperature of the coldest month between 2 °C (35.6 °F) and 13 °C (55.4 °F) in the Northern Hemisphere and between 6 °C (42.8 °F) and 13 °C (55.4 °F) in the Southern Hemisphere, excluding oceanic and continental climates. According to the Troll-Paffen climate classification, there generally exists one large subtropical zone named the warm-temperate subtropical zone, which is subdivided into seven smaller areas.

According to the E. Neef climate classification, the subtropical zone is divided into two parts: rainy winters of the west sides and eastern subtropical climate. According to the Wilhelm Lauer & Peter Frankenberg climate classification, the subtropical zone is divided into three parts: high-continental, continental, and maritime. According to the Siegmund/Frankenberg climate classification, subtropical is one of six climate zones in the world.

Leslie Holdridge defined the subtropical climates as having a mean annual biotemperature between the frost line or critical temperature line, 16 °C to 18 °C (depending on locations in the world), and 24 °C. The frost line separates the warm temperate region from the subtropical region. It represents the dividing line between two major physiological groups of evolved plants. Most of the plants are sensitive to low temperatures on the warmer side of the line. They can be killed back by frosts as they have not evolved to withstand periods of cold. On the colder temperate side of the line, the total flora is adapted to survive periods of variable lengths of low temperatures, whether as seeds in the case of the annuals or as perennial plants that can withstand the cold. The 16 °C–18 °C segment is often "simplified" as 17 °C $\bigl(2^{(\log_{2}12\ +\ 0.5)}\ ^\circ\! \mathrm{C} \approx16.97\ ^\circ\! \mathrm{C}\bigr)$.

The Holdridge subtropical climates straddle more or less the warmest subtropical climates and the less warm tropical climates as defined by the Köppen-Geiger or Trewartha climate classifications.

However, Wladimir Köppen has distinguished the hot or subtropical and tropical (semi-)arid climates (BWh or BSh) having an average annual temperature greater than or equal to 18 °C (64.4 °F) from the cold or temperate (semi-)arid climates (BWk or BSk) whose annual temperature average is lower. This definition, though restricted to dry regions, is almost similar to Holdridge's.

== Rainfall ==
Hadley cells on the Earth's atmospheric circulation

Heating of the earth by the sun near the equator leads to large amounts of upward motion and convection winds along the monsoon trough or Intertropical Convergence Zone. The upper-level divergence over the near-equatorial trough leads to air rising and moving away from the equator aloft. As the air moves towards the mid-latitudes, it cools, gets denser and sinks, which leads to subsidence near the 30th parallel of both hemispheres. This circulation is known as the Hadley cell and leads to the formation of the subtropical ridge. Many of the world's deserts are caused by these climatological high-pressure areas, within the subtropics. This regime is known as a semiarid/arid subtropical climate, which is generally in areas adjacent to powerful cold ocean currents. Examples of this climate are the coastal areas of Southern Africa and the west coast of South America.

The humid subtropical climate is often on the western side of the subtropical high. Here, unstable tropical airmasses in summer bring convective overturning and frequent tropical downpours, and summer is normally the season of peak annual rainfall. In the winter (dry season) the monsoon retreats, and the drier trade winds bring more stable airmass and often dry weather, and frequent sunny skies. Areas that have this type of subtropical climate include Australia, the Indo-Gangetic Plain in South Asia, and parts of South America. In areas bounded by warm ocean like the southeastern United States and East Asia, tropical cyclones can contribute significantly to local rainfall within the subtropics. Japan receives over half of its rainfall from typhoons.

The Mediterranean climate is a subtropical climate, usually found on the western side of continents, with a wet season in winter and a dry season in the summer. Regions with this type of climate include the rim lands of the Mediterranean Sea, southwestern Australia, parts of the west coast of South America around Santiago and the coastal areas of the lower west coast of the United States.

== Flora ==
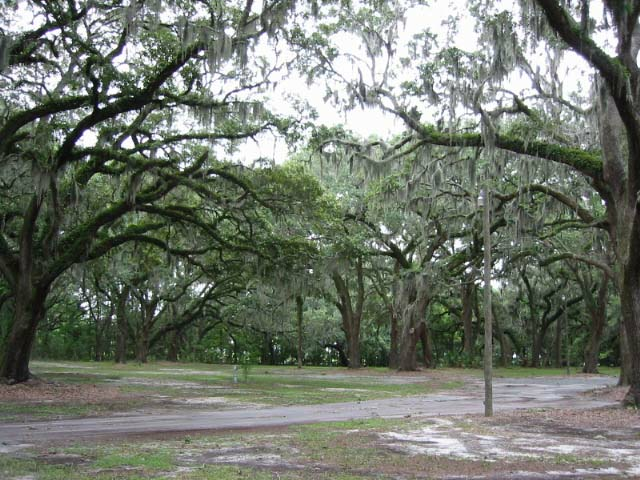
Live oaks on Skidaway Island, Savannah, Georgia.

These climates do not routinely see hard freezes or snow due to winter on average being above freezing, which allows plants such as palms and citrus to flourish. As one moves toward the tropical side the slight winter cool season disappears, while at the poleward threshold of the subtropics the winters become cooler. Some crops which have been traditionally farmed in tropical climates, such as mango, lychee, avocado and aloe vera, are also cultivated in the subtropics. Pest control of the crops is easier than in the tropics, due to the cooler winters.

Tree ferns (pteridophytes) are grown in subtropical areas, as are dracaena and yucca, and trees in the Taxaceae. Apple, pear and pomegranate also grow well in the subtropics.

== Varieties ==
=== Humid subtropical climate ===
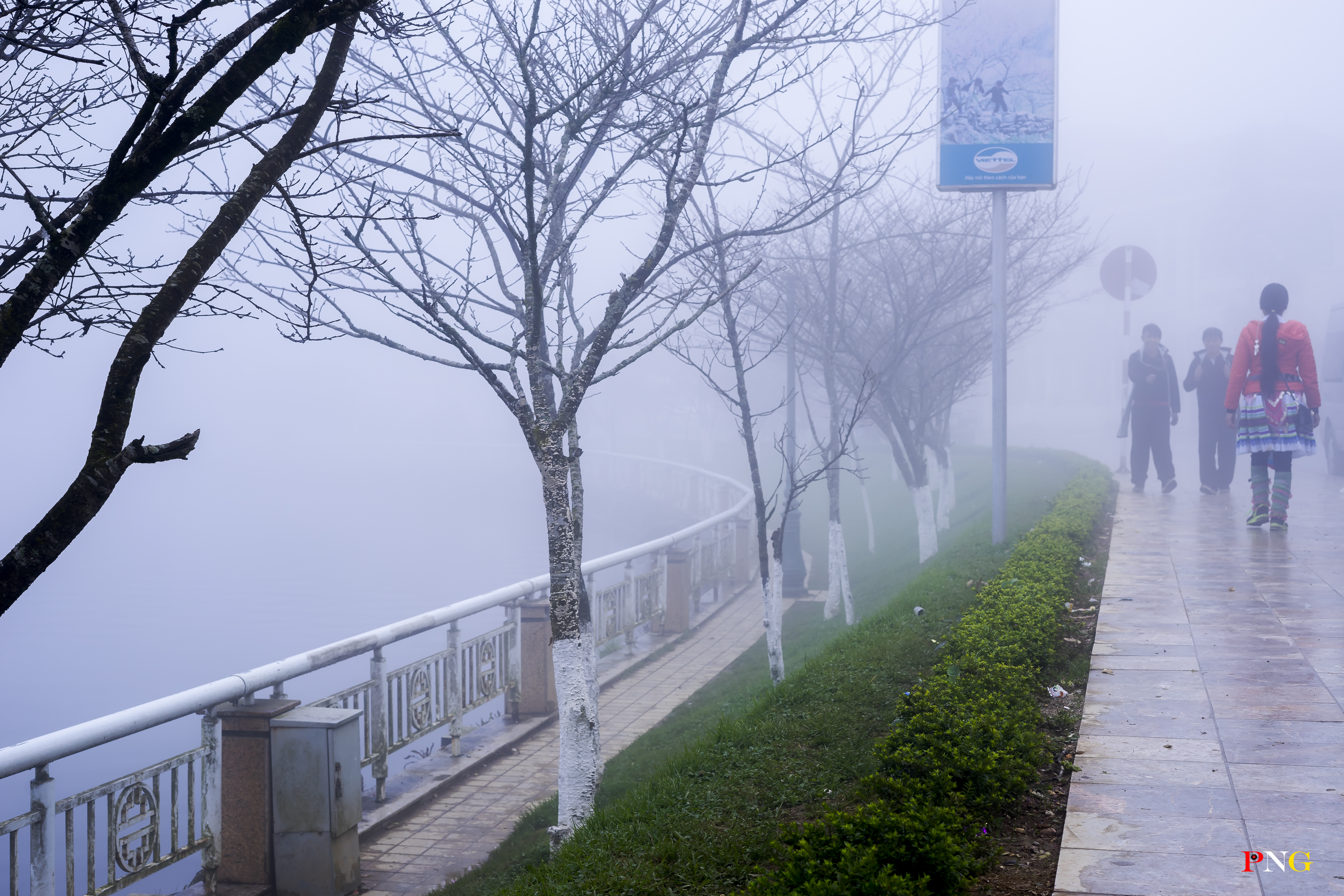
Natural fog in Northwest Vietnam

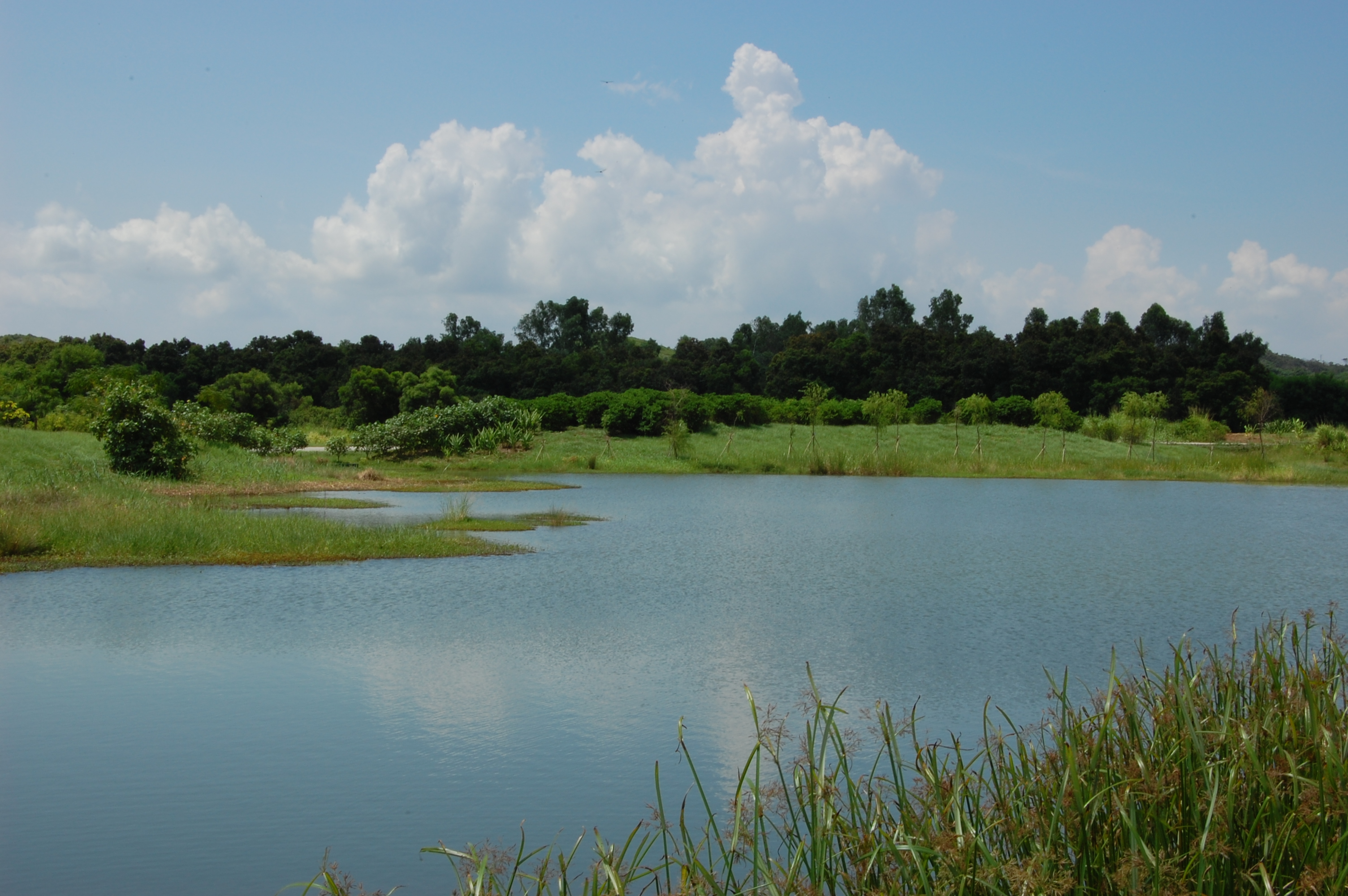
Wetland Park in Hong Kong

The humid subtropical climate is a subtropical climate type characterized by hot, humid summers and generally mild winters. This climate can be found in northern Middle East, northern South Asia, Northern Vietnam, eastern Australia, southern and southeastern China, southern and central Japan, the deep southeastern United States, southeastern South America, and the tip of southeastern Africa.

In most humid subtropical climates, summer is the wettest season. In summer, the subtropical high pressure cells provide a sultry southernly flow of tropical air with high dew points, and frequent (but brief) convective showers are common. With decreasing latitude most humid subtropical climates typically have drier winters and wetter summers, however some sectors with this climate see a more even rhythm of seasonal rainfall. Tropical lows and weakening tropical storms often contribute to seasonal rainfall in most humid subtropical climates. In the cool season (winter) when the subtropical highs retreat, the humid subtropics are more influenced by the westerlies and the fronts and storms that move with them.

Hanoi, Vietnam

Climate chart (precipitation, max. and min. temperature)
J	F	M	A	M	J	J	A	S	O	N	D
23 19 14	25 20 16	47 23 18	92 28 22	185 32 25	253 33 26	280 33 27	309 33 26	228 32 25	141 29 23	67 26 19	20 22 16
- █ Average max. and min. temperatures in °C
- █ Precipitation totals in mm
- Source: Vietnam Institute for Building Science and Technology
Imperial conversion
J	F	M	A	M	J	J	A	S	O	N	D
0.9 67 58	1 69 60	1.9 74 65	3.6 82 71	7.3 89 77	10 92 80	11 92 80	12 91 79	9 89 77	5.5 85 73	2.6 78 67	0.8 72 60
- █ Average max. and min. temperatures in °F
- █ Precipitation totals in inches

Orlando, United States

Climate chart (precipitation, max. and min. temperature)
J	F	M	A	M	J	J	A	S	O	N	D
63 22 10	52 24 11	77 26 13	66 29 16	102 31 19	204 33 22	189 33 23	195 33 23	162 32 22	88 29 19	45 26 15	63 23 12
- █ Average max. and min. temperatures in °C
- █ Precipitation totals in mm
- Source: NOAA
Imperial conversion
J	F	M	A	M	J	J	A	S	O	N	D
2.5 72 49	2 75 52	3 79 56	2.6 84 61	4 88 66	8 91 72	7.4 92 73	7.7 92 74	6.4 90 72	3.5 85 66	1.8 78 58	2.5 74 53
- █ Average max. and min. temperatures in °F
- █ Precipitation totals in inches

New Delhi, India

Climate chart (precipitation, max. and min. temperature)
J	F	M	A	M	J	J	A	S	O	N	D
20 20 7	26 24 10	21 30 15	13 36 21	26 40 25	88 39 27	197 36 27	226 34 27	131 34 25	17 33 19	5.4 28 13	11 23 8
- █ Average max. and min. temperatures in °C
- █ Precipitation totals in mm
- Source: WMO
Imperial conversion
J	F	M	A	M	J	J	A	S	O	N	D
0.8 68 45	1 76 51	0.8 86 60	0.5 98 70	1 103 78	3.5 102 81	7.8 96 81	8.9 94 80	5.2 93 77	0.7 91 67	0.2 83 55	0.4 73 47
- █ Average max. and min. temperatures in °F
- █ Precipitation totals in inches

=== Subtropical highland climate ===
The Subtropical highland climate is a climate variant often grouped together with oceanic climates found in some mountainous areas of either the subtropics or tropics. It has characteristically mild temperatures year-round, featuring the four seasons in the subtropics and no marked seasons in the tropics, the latter usually remaining mild to cool through most of the year. Subtropical highland climates under the Cfb classification usually have rainfall spread relatively evenly in all months of the year similar to most oceanic climates while climates under the Cwb classification have significant monsoon influence, usually having dry winters and wet summers.

Mexico City

Climate chart (precipitation, max. and min. temperature)
J	F	M	A	M	J	J	A	S	O	N	D
11 21 6	4.3 23 7	10 26 9	26 27 11	56 27 12	135 25 12	175 23 12	169 23 12	145 22 12	67 22 10	12 22 8	6 21 7
- █ Average max. and min. temperatures in °C
- █ Precipitation totals in mm
- Source: WMO
Imperial conversion
J	F	M	A	M	J	J	A	S	O	N	D
0.4 70 42	0.2 73 45	0.4 78 49	1 80 51	2.2 80 53	5.3 76 54	6.9 73 53	6.7 74 53	5.7 72 53	2.6 72 50	0.5 71 46	0.2 69 44
- █ Average max. and min. temperatures in °F
- █ Precipitation totals in inches

Addis Ababa, Ethiopia

Climate chart (precipitation, max. and min. temperature)
J	F	M	A	M	J	J	A	S	O	N	D
17 23 9	36 24 9	68 25 11	89 25 12	76 25 13	124 23 12	259 21 12	278 20 12	174 22 12	41 23 10	8.3 23 8	10 22 8
- █ Average max. and min. temperatures in °C
- █ Precipitation totals in mm
- Source: NMAE
Imperial conversion
J	F	M	A	M	J	J	A	S	O	N	D
0.7 74 48	1.4 76 49	2.7 76 51	3.5 77 54	3 77 55	4.9 74 54	10 69 54	11 68 53	6.9 71 53	1.6 73 50	0.3 73 47	0.4 72 46
- █ Average max. and min. temperatures in °F
- █ Precipitation totals in inches

=== Mediterranean climate ===
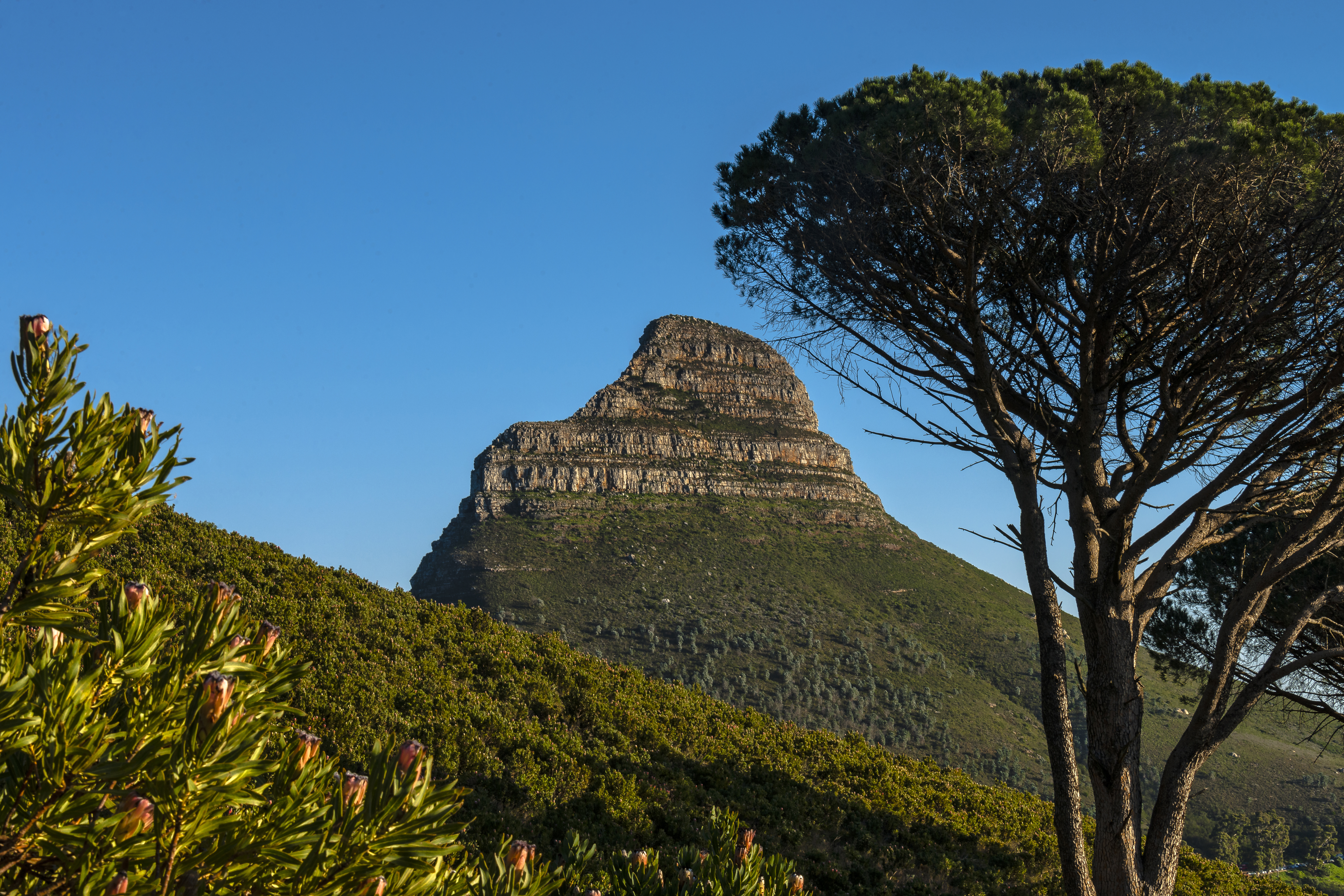
Fynbos in South Africa

The Mediterranean climate regime resembles the climate of the lands in the Mediterranean Basin, parts of lower West Coast of the United States, parts of Western and South Australia, in southwestern South Africa and in parts of central Chile. The climate is characterized by hot dry summers and cooler winters with rainfall. In Europe, the northernmost mediterranean climates are found along the Italian Riviera, at 44° latitude.

Los Angeles

Climate chart (precipitation, max. and min. temperature)
J	F	M	A	M	J	J	A	S	O	N	D
79 21 10	97 21 10	62 23 12	23 26 13	6.6 27 15	2.3 28 17	0.3 31 19	1 32 19	6.1 31 19	17 28 17	26 24 12	59 21 10
- █ Average max. and min. temperatures in °C
- █ Precipitation totals in mm
Imperial conversion
J	F	M	A	M	J	J	A	S	O	N	D
3.1 70 49	3.8 70 50	2.4 74 53	0.9 78 56	0.3 80 58	0.1 83 62	0 87 65	0 90 66	0.2 89 66	0.7 82 62	1 75 54	2.3 69 49
- █ Average max. and min. temperatures in °F
- █ Precipitation totals in inches

Porto

Climate chart (precipitation, max. and min. temperature)
J	F	M	A	M	J	J	A	S	O	N	D
158 14 5	140 15 6	90 17 8	116 18 9	98 20 12	46 24 15	18 25 16	27 26 16	71 24 15	138 21 12	158 17 9	195 14 7
- █ Average max. and min. temperatures in °C
- █ Precipitation totals in mm
- Source: Instituto de Meteorologia
Imperial conversion
J	F	M	A	M	J	J	A	S	O	N	D
6.2 57 41	5.5 59 43	3.5 63 46	4.6 65 48	3.8 68 53	1.8 74 58	0.7 78 61	1.1 78 61	2.8 75 58	5.4 69 54	6.2 63 48	7.7 58 44
- █ Average max. and min. temperatures in °F
- █ Precipitation totals in inches

Cape Town

Climate chart (precipitation, max. and min. temperature)
J	F	M	A	M	J	J	A	S	O	N	D
15 26 16	17 27 16	20 25 14	41 23 12	69 20 9	93 18 8	82 18 7	77 18 8	40 19 9	30 21 11	14 24 13	17 25 15
- █ Average max. and min. temperatures in °C
- █ Precipitation totals in mm
- Source: HKO
Imperial conversion
J	F	M	A	M	J	J	A	S	O	N	D
0.6 79 60	0.7 80 60	0.8 78 58	1.6 73 53	2.7 69 49	3.7 65 46	3.2 64 45	3 64 46	1.6 67 48	1.2 70 51	0.6 74 56	0.7 77 59
- █ Average max. and min. temperatures in °F
- █ Precipitation totals in inches

=== Semi-desert/desert climate ===
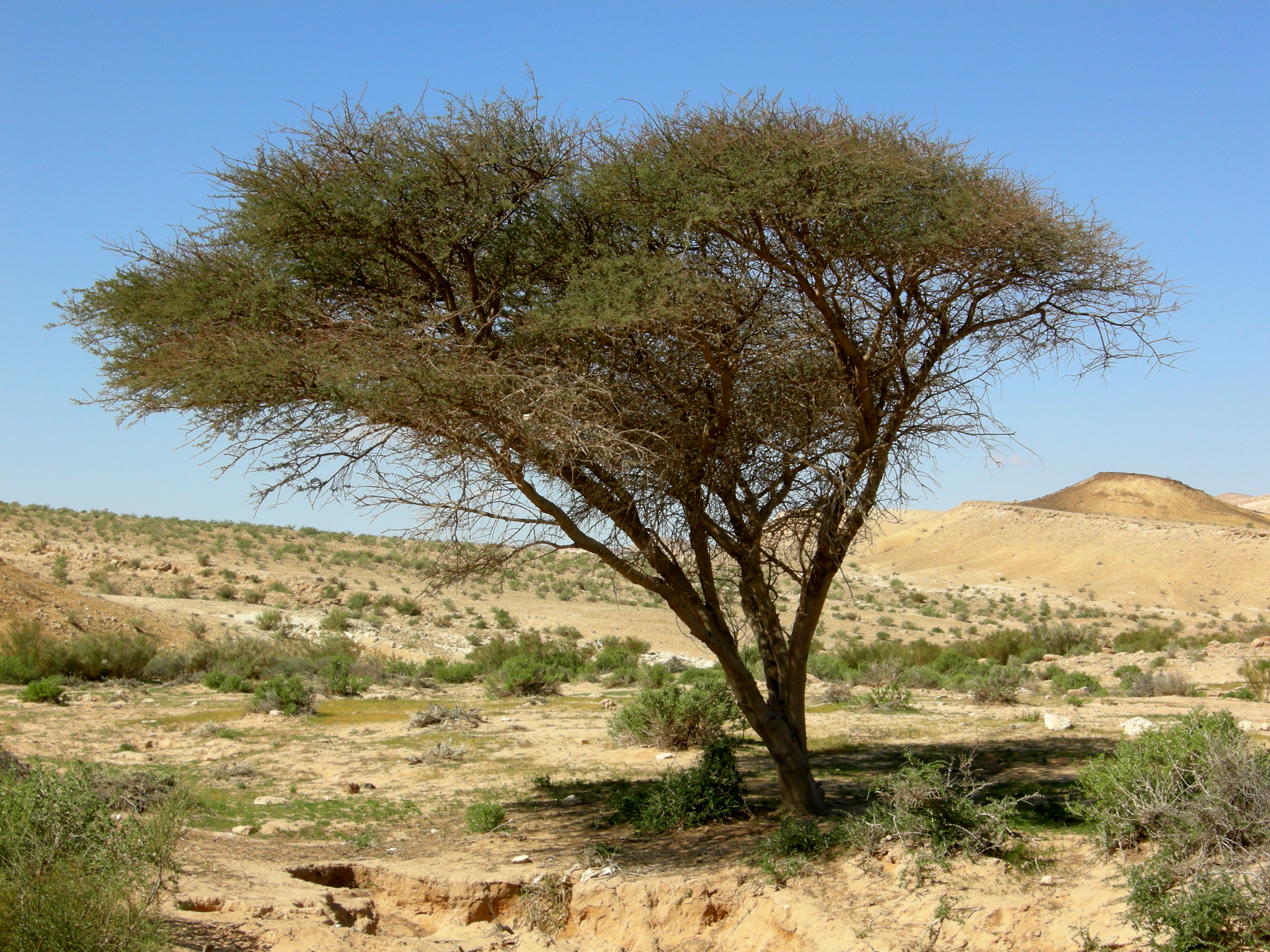
Acacia in HaMakhtesh HaGadol, Negev Desert

According to Köppen, arid subtropical climates are characterized by an annual average temperature above 18 °C (64.4 °F), the absence of regular rainfall, and high humidity.

Alicante

Climate chart (precipitation, max. and min. temperature)
J	F	M	A	M	J	J	A	S	O	N	D
22 17 6	26 18 7	26 19 8	30 21 10	33 24 13	17 27 17	6 30 20	8 30 20	47 28 18	52 24 14	42 21 10	26 18 7
- █ Average max. and min. temperatures in °C
- █ Precipitation totals in mm
- Source: AEdM
Imperial conversion
J	F	M	A	M	J	J	A	S	O	N	D
0.9 62 43	1 64 45	1 67 47	1.2 70 50	1.3 74 56	0.7 81 63	0.2 86 67	0.3 87 69	1.9 83 64	2 76 57	1.7 69 50	1 64 45
- █ Average max. and min. temperatures in °F
- █ Precipitation totals in inches

Cairo

Climate chart (precipitation, max. and min. temperature)
J	F	M	A	M	J	J	A	S	O	N	D
4.8 19 10	3.8 21 11	6.3 24 13	1.3 28 16	0.2 32 19	0 35 22	0 35 24	0 35 24	0 33 23	0.7 30 20	4.3 25 16	3.4 21 12
- █ Average max. and min. temperatures in °C
- █ Precipitation totals in mm
- Source: NOAA
Imperial conversion
J	F	M	A	M	J	J	A	S	O	N	D
0.2 66 50	0.1 69 52	0.2 75 56	0.1 83 61	0 90 67	0 94 72	0 95 75	0 95 76	0 92 73	0 86 68	0.2 77 60	0.1 69 53
- █ Average max. and min. temperatures in °F
- █ Precipitation totals in inches

Lima

Climate chart (precipitation, max. and min. temperature)
J	F	M	A	M	J	J	A	S	O	N	D
0.9 26 19	0.3 27 19	4.9 26 19	0 24 18	0.1 22 16	0.3 20 15	0.3 19 15	0.3 18 15	5.4 19 15	0.2 20 15	0 22 16	0.3 24 18
- █ Average max. and min. temperatures in °C
- █ Precipitation totals in mm
- Source: WMO
Imperial conversion
J	F	M	A	M	J	J	A	S	O	N	D
0 78 66	0 80 67	0.2 79 67	0 76 64	0 71 61	0 67 60	0 66 59	0 65 58	0.2 66 58	0 68 59	0 71 62	0 75 64
- █ Average max. and min. temperatures in °F
- █ Precipitation totals in inches

== See also ==
- Geographical zone
- Subtropical cyclone
- 35th parallel north
- 35th parallel south
- Tropic of Cancer
- Tropic of Capricorn
