= Sukyoung Lee =

Atmospheric scientist

- Education: Princeton University
- Scientific career
- Thesis: Baroclinic wave packets in models and observations (1991)
- Doctoral advisor: Isaac Held

Sukyoung Lee is a professor at Pennsylvania State University known for her research on circulation in Earth's atmosphere and the Southern Ocean. In 2021 Lee was elected a fellow of the American Geophysical Union.

== Education and career ==
Lee earned her Ph.D. in 1991 from Princeton University where she worked on baroclinic waves. As of 2021, she is a professor at Pennsylvania State University.

== Research ==
Lee is known for her research on Earth's atmosphere, ocean circulation in the Southern Ocean, planetary atmospheres, and climate. In 2013, her research revealed that recent changes in the ozone layer causes geographic shifts in the location of the jet stream.

== Selected publications ==
- L’Heureux, Michelle L.; Lee, Sukyoung; Lyon, Bradfield (2013). "Recent multidecadal strengthening of the Walker circulation across the tropical Pacific". Nature Climate Change. 3 (6): 571–576. Bibcode:2013NatCC...3..571L. doi:10.1038/nclimate1840. ISSN 1758-678X.
- Lee, Sukyoung; Gong, Tingting; Johnson, Nathaniel; Feldstein, Steven B.; Pollard, David (2011-08-15). "On the Possible Link between Tropical Convection and the Northern Hemisphere Arctic Surface Air Temperature Change between 1958 and 2001". Journal of Climate. 24 (16): 4350–4367. Bibcode:2011JCli...24.4350L. doi:10.1175/2011JCLI4003.1. ISSN 0894-8755.
- Lee, Sukyoung; Feldstein, Steven B. (2013-02-01). "Detecting Ozone- and Greenhouse Gas–Driven Wind Trends with Observational Data". Science. 339 (6119): 563–567. Bibcode:2013Sci...339..563L. doi:10.1126/science.1225154. ISSN 0036-8075. PMID 23372010. S2CID 39967515.
- Park, Doo-Sun R.; Lee, Sukyoung; Feldstein, Steven B. (2015-05-15). "Attribution of the Recent Winter Sea Ice Decline over the Atlantic Sector of the Arctic Ocean*". Journal of Climate. 28 (10): 4027–4033. Bibcode:2015JCli...28.4027P. doi:10.1175/JCLI-D-15-0042.1. ISSN 0894-8755. S2CID 140676727.

== Awards and honors ==
- Fellow, American Geophysical Union (2021)
- Wilson Award for Excellence in Research, Pennsylvania State University (2021)
