= Thermal loop =

A thermal loop is a movement of air driven by warm air rising at one end of the loop, and cool air descending at the other end, creating a constantly moving loop of air. They can be used to precisely control the temperature of a specific area. Thermal loops also occur in liquids.

Thermal loops are size-independent; that is to say, they may occur in a space as small as a room or as large as a global hemisphere. The Hadley cell is an example of a global-scale thermal loop.
