= 60th parallel =

60th parallel may refer to:

- 60th parallel north, a circle of latitude in the Northern Hemisphere
- 60th parallel south, a circle of latitude in the Southern Hemisphere
