= George Hadley =

English lawyer and amateur meteorologist

- Born: 12 February 1685; London, England
- Died: 28 June 1768 (aged 83)
- Occupations: Lawyer, amateur meteorologist and physicist

George Hadley (12 February 1685 – 28 June 1768) was an English lawyer and amateur meteorologist who proposed the atmospheric mechanism by which the trade winds are sustained, which is now named in his honour as Hadley circulation. As a key factor in ensuring that European sailing vessels reached North American shores, understanding the trade winds was becoming a matter of great importance at the time. Hadley was intrigued by the fact that winds which should by all rights have blown straight north had a pronounced westerly flow, and it was this mystery he set out to solve.

== Life ==
Hadley was born in London, England to George Hadley (High Sheriff of Hertfordshire) and Katherine FitzJames. He had an unremarkable childhood, and was eclipsed in his early years by his older brother John Hadley (1682–1744), the inventor of the octant (a precursor to the sextant). With John and his other brother Henry, George had constructed effective Newtonian telescopes.

George Hadley entered Pembroke College, Oxford, on 30 May 1700, and on 13 August 1701 became a member of Lincoln's Inn, where his father purchased chambers for him. He was called to the bar on 1 July 1709, but remained more interested in mechanical and physical studies than in legal work. For 7 years, succeeding William Derham, he was in charge of interpreting the meteorological diaries sent to the Royal Society from observers around the world, mainly in Britain and Scandinavia. He tried to correlate the data in the different temperature and pressure scales then in use and attempted to deduce general patterns that emerged over time. He twice published an account of the results in the Philosophical Transactions of the Royal Society.

Hadley was elected a Fellow of the Royal Society on 20 February 1735, and on 22 May that year published a short paper in the Philosophical Transactions (vol. 39, 1735, 58–62) giving an explanation of the trade winds. His theory remained relatively unknown and was independently created several times. Among the later creators was John Dalton, who later eventually became aware of Hadley's priority. During the second half of the 19th century the theory gradually became known as "Hadley's principle".

In 1686, Edmond Halley had proposed a theory in an attempt to explain the trade winds, a theory which remained the most widely known internationally almost to the beginning of the 19th century. George Hadley's version recognised that the Earth's rotation plays a role in the direction taken by an air mass moving relative to the Earth, an element that had been missing in Halley's proposal. Later, in the second half of the 19th century, Hadley's theory was itself shown to be deficient in that it was based on an assumption that when air mass travels from one latitude to another its linear momentum is conserved. However, since the air mass is at all times in a state of circumnavigating the Earth axis, it is in fact the angular momentum that is conserved, causing an effect known as the Coriolis effect. When using the correct angular momentum conservation in calculations the predicted effect is twice as large as when the erroneous conservation of linear momentum is used. The fact that Hadley's principle is deficient in this respect is not known to everyone who should know; it can still be found in popular books and popular websites.

Hadley never married. In later life he left London and lived for a while at East Barnet with a nephew, most likely his brother John Hadley's son John. Most of his later years were spent at Flitton, Bedfordshire, where another nephew, Hadley Cox (d. 1782), son of his sister Elizabeth, was vicar.

Hadley died at Flitton on 28 June 1768 aged 83 years, and was buried in the chancel of Flitton church. Another nephew, Henry's son John, also became a Fellow of the Royal Society.

== Commemorations ==
The Met Office Hadley Centre was named in his honour. A crater on Mars was also named after him.

== See also ==
- Hadley cell

== Bibliography ==
- Hadley, George (1735). "Concerning the cause of the general trade winds". Philosophical Transactions of the Royal Society of London. 39 (437): 58–62. doi:10.1098/rstl.1735.0014. S2CID 186209280.
