= 30th parallel =

30th parallel may refer to:

- 30th parallel north, a circle of latitude in the Northern Hemisphere
- 30th parallel south, a circle of latitude in the Southern Hemisphere
