= Hadley cell =

Tropical atmospheric circulation feature

Diagram of global circulation patterns with Hadley cells, Polar cells, mid-latitude Ferrel cells, Westerlies, Trade winds and the median position of the Intertropical convergence zone

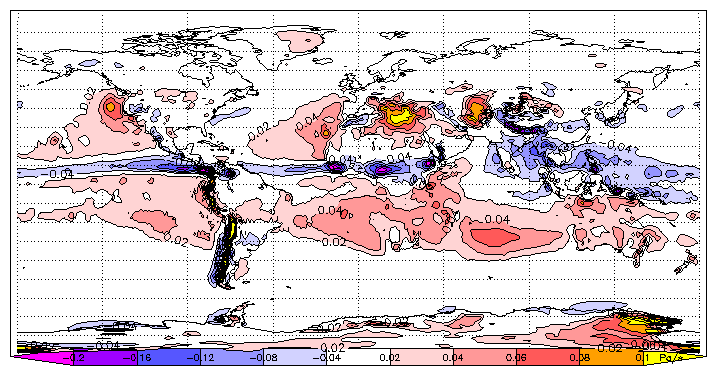
Average vertical velocity (in pascals per second) at the 500 hPa pressure height in July from 1979 to 2001. Ascent (negative values) is concentrated close to the solar equator while descent (positive values) is more diffuse; their distribution is an imprint of the ascending and descending branches of the Hadley circulation.

The Hadley cell, also known as the Hadley circulation, is a global-scale tropical atmospheric circulation that features air rising near the equator, flowing poleward near the tropopause at a height of 12–15 km (7.5–9.3 mi) above the Earth's surface, cooling and descending in the subtropics at around 30 degrees latitude, and then returning equatorward near the surface. It is a thermally direct circulation within the troposphere that emerges due to differences in insolation and heating between the tropics and the subtropics. On a yearly average, the circulation is characterized by a circulation cell on each side of the equator. The Southern Hemisphere Hadley cell is slightly stronger on average than its northern counterpart, extending slightly beyond the equator into the Northern Hemisphere. During the summer and winter months, the Hadley circulation is dominated by a single, cross-equatorial cell with air rising in the summer hemisphere and sinking in the winter hemisphere. Analogous circulations may occur in extraterrestrial atmospheres, such as on Venus and Mars.

Global climate is greatly influenced by the structure and behavior of the Hadley circulation. The prevailing trade winds are a manifestation of the lower branches of the Hadley circulation, converging air and moisture in the tropics to form the Intertropical Convergence Zone (ITCZ) where the Earth's heaviest rains are located. Shifts in the ITCZ associated with the seasonal variability of the Hadley circulation cause monsoons. The sinking branches of the Hadley cells give rise to the oceanic subtropical ridges and suppress rainfall; many of the Earth's deserts and arid regions are located in the subtropics coincident with the position of the sinking branches. The Hadley circulation is also a key mechanism for the meridional transport of heat, angular momentum and moisture, contributing to the subtropical jet stream, the moist tropics and maintaining a global thermal equilibrium.

The Hadley circulation is named after George Hadley, who in 1735 postulated the existence of hemisphere-spanning circulation cells driven by differences in heating to explain the trade winds. Other scientists later developed similar arguments or critiqued Hadley's qualitative theory, providing more rigorous explanations and formalism. The existence of a broad meridional circulation of the type suggested by Hadley was confirmed in the mid-20th century once routine observations of the upper troposphere became available via radiosondes. Observations and climate modelling indicate that the Hadley circulation has expanded poleward since at least the 1980s as a result of climate change, with an accompanying but less certain intensification of the circulation; these changes have been associated with trends in regional weather patterns. Model projections suggest that the circulation will widen and weaken throughout the 21st century due to climate change.

== Mechanism and characteristics ==
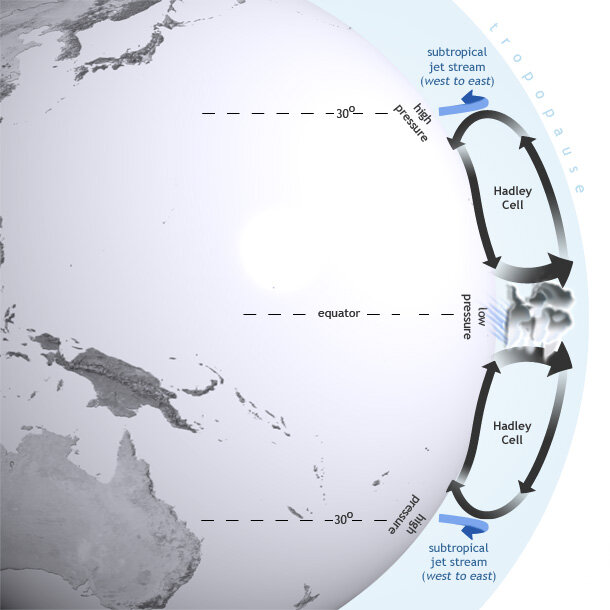
On average, the Hadley circulation is composed of two cells in the Northern and Southern hemispheres that circulate air within the tropics.

The Hadley circulation describes the broad, thermally direct (Note: A thermally direct circulation exhibits on average rising air over warmer regions and sinking air over cooler regions, resulting in heat being added at a higher pressure than when heat is removed. This differs from a thermally indirect circulation in which input mechanical energy allows air to rise over cooler regions and sink over warmer regions. Refrigeration is analogous to a thermally indirect circulation.) and meridional (Note: Meridional motions are in the direction of north or south, along lines of longitude, while zonal motions are in the direction of west or east, along lines of latitude.) overturning of air within the troposphere over the low latitudes. Within the global atmospheric circulation, the meridional flow of air averaged along lines of latitude are organized into circulations of rising and sinking motions coupled with the equatorward or poleward movement of air called meridional cells. These include the prominent "Hadley cells" centered over the tropics and the weaker "Ferrel cells" centered over the mid-latitudes. The Hadley cells result from the contrast of insolation between the warm equatorial regions and the cooler subtropical regions. The uneven heating of Earth's surface results in regions of rising and descending air. Over the course of a year, the equatorial regions absorb more radiation from the Sun than they radiate away. At higher latitudes, the Earth emits more radiation than it receives from the Sun. Without a mechanism to exchange heat meridionally, the equatorial regions would warm and the higher latitudes would cool progressively in disequilibrium. The broad ascent and descent of air results in a pressure gradient force that drives the Hadley circulation and other large-scale flows in both the atmosphere and the ocean, distributing heat and maintaining a global long-term and subseasonal thermal equilibrium.

The Hadley circulation covers almost half of the Earth's surface area, spanning from roughly the Tropic of Cancer to the Tropic of Capricorn. Vertically, the circulation occupies the entire depth of the troposphere. The Hadley cells comprising the circulation consist of air carried equatorward by the trade winds in the lower troposphere that ascends when heated near the equator, along with air moving poleward in the upper troposphere. Air that is moved into the subtropics cools and then sinks before returning equatorward to the tropics; the position of the sinking air associated with the Hadley cell is often used as a measure of the meridional width of the global tropics. The equatorward return of air and the strong influence of heating make the Hadley cell a thermally driven and enclosed circulation. Due to the buoyant rise of air near the equator and the sinking of air at higher latitudes, a pressure gradient develops near the surface with lower pressures near the equator and higher pressures in the subtropics; this provides the motive force for the equatorward flow in the lower troposphere. However, the release of latent heat associated with condensation in the tropics also relaxes the decrease in pressure with height, resulting in higher pressures aloft in the tropics compared to the subtropics for a given height in the upper troposphere; this pressure gradient is stronger than its near-surface counterpart and provides the motive force for the poleward flow in the upper troposphere. Hadley cells are most commonly identified using the mass-weighted, zonally averaged stream function of meridional winds, but they can also be identified by other measurable or derivable physical parameters such as velocity potential or the vertical component of wind at a particular pressure level.

Given the latitude $\phi$ and the pressure level $p$, the Stokes stream function characterizing the Hadley circulation is given by

$$\psi(\phi, p) = \frac{2 \pi a \cos \phi}{g}\int_0^p[v(\phi,p)] \, dp$$

where $a$ is the radius of Earth, $g$ is the acceleration due to the gravity of Earth, and $[v(\phi, p)]$ is the zonally averaged meridional wind at the prescribed latitude and pressure level. The value of $\psi$ gives the integrated meridional mass flux between the specified pressure level and the top of the Earth's atmosphere, with positive values indicating northward mass transport. The strength of the Hadley cells can be quantified based on $\psi$ including the maximum and minimum values or averages of the stream function both overall and at various pressure levels. Hadley cell intensity can also be assessed using other physical quantities such as the velocity potential, vertical component of wind, transport of water vapor, or total energy of the circulation.

=== Structure and components ===
The structure of the Hadley circulation and its components can be inferred by graphing zonal and temporal averages of global winds throughout the troposphere. At shorter timescales, individual weather systems perturb wind flow. Although the structure of the Hadley circulation varies seasonally, when winds are averaged annually (from an Eulerian perspective) the Hadley circulation is roughly symmetric and composed of two similar Hadley cells with one in each of the Northern and Southern hemispheres, sharing a common region of ascending air near the equator; however, the Southern Hemisphere Hadley cell is stronger. The winds associated with the annually averaged Hadley circulation are on the order of 5 m/s (18 km/h; 11 mph). However, when averaging the motions of air parcels as opposed to the winds at fixed locations (a Lagrangian perspective), the Hadley circulation manifests as a broader circulation that extends farther poleward. Each Hadley cell can be described by four primary branches of airflow within the tropics:

- An equatorward, lower branch within the planetary boundary layer
- An ascending branch near the equator
- A poleward, upper branch in the upper troposphere
- A descending branch in the subtropics

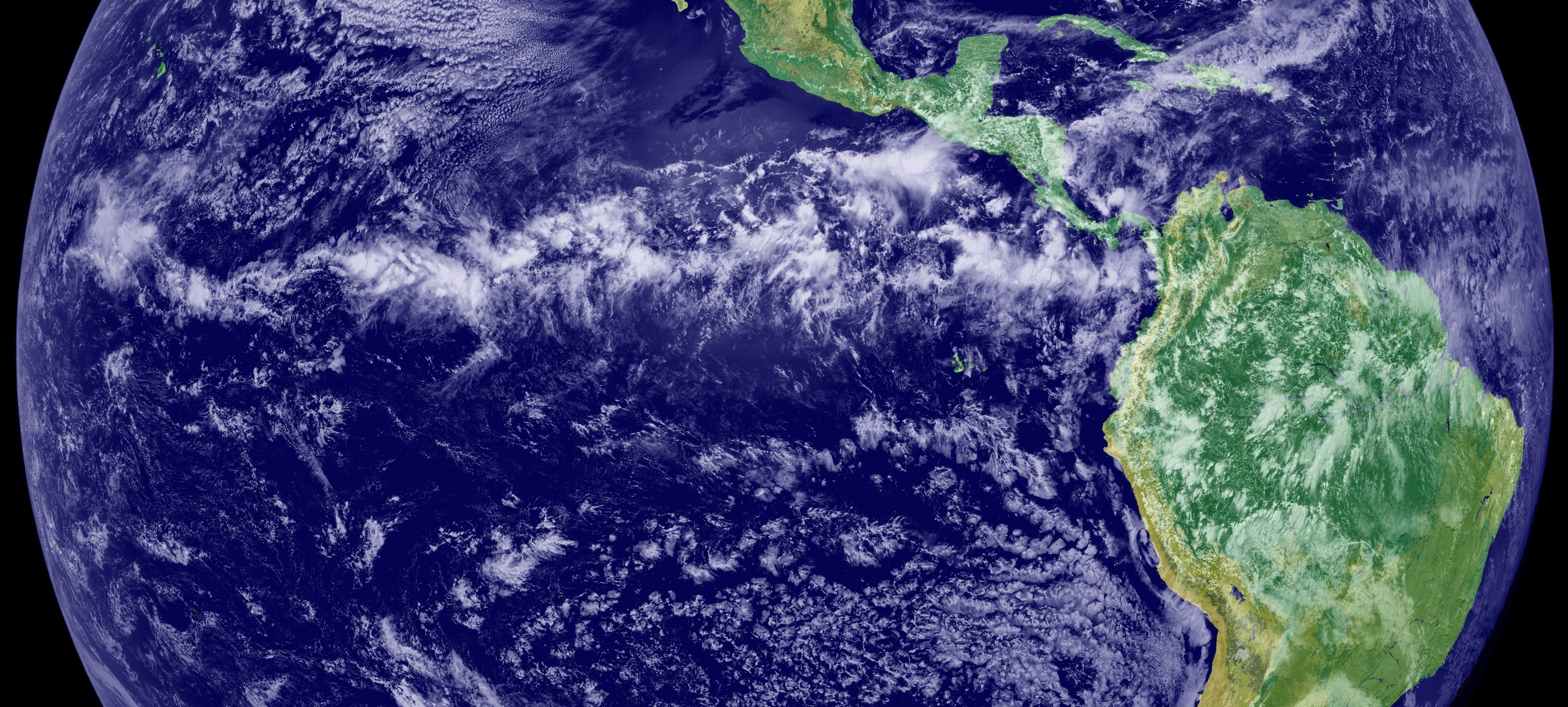
The heating of air along the thermal equator causes it to rise, generating a low-pressure area that pulls in air from the north and south, causing the convergence of winds near the equator known as the Intertropical Convergence Zone.

The trade winds in the low latitudes of both Earth's Northern and Southern hemispheres converge air towards the equator, due to a belt of low atmospheric pressure exhibiting abundant storms and heavy rainfall known as the Intertropical Convergence Zone (ITCZ). This equatorward movement of air near the Earth's surface constitutes the lower branch of the Hadley cell. The position of the ITCZ is influenced by the warmth of sea surface temperatures (SST) near the equator and the strength of cross-equatorial pressure gradients. In general, the ITCZ is located near the equator or is offset towards the summer hemisphere where the warmest SSTs are located. On an annual average, the rising branch of the Hadley circulation is slightly offset towards the Northern Hemisphere, away from the equator. Due to the Coriolis force, the trade winds deflect opposite the direction of Earth's rotation, blowing partially westward rather than directly equatorward in both hemispheres. The lower branch accrues moisture resulting from evaporation across Earth's tropical oceans. A warmer environment and converging winds force the moistened air to ascend near the equator, resulting in the rising branch of the Hadley cell. The upward motion is further enhanced by the release of latent heat as the uplift of moist air results in an equatorial band of condensation and precipitation. The Hadley circulation's upward branch largely occurs in thunderstorms occupying only around one percent of the surface area of the tropics. The transport of heat in the Hadley circulation's ascending branch is accomplished most efficiently by hot towers—cumulonimbus clouds bearing strong updrafts that do not mix in drier air commonly found in the middle troposphere and thus allow the movement of air from the highly moist tropical lower troposphere into the upper troposphere. Approximately 1,500–5,000 hot towers daily near the ITCZ region are required to sustain the vertical heat transport exhibited by the Hadley circulation.

The ascent of air rises into the upper troposphere to a height of 12–15 km (7.5–9.3 mi), after which air diverges outward from the ITCZ and towards the poles. The top of the Hadley cell is set by the height of the tropopause as the stable stratosphere above prevents the continued ascent of air. Air arising from the low latitudes has higher absolute angular momentum about Earth's axis of rotation. The distance between the atmosphere and Earth's axis decreases poleward; to conserve angular momentum, poleward-moving air parcels must accelerate eastward. The Coriolis effect limits the poleward extent of the Hadley circulation, accelerating air in the direction of the Earth's rotation and forming a jet stream directed zonally rather than continuing the poleward flow of air at each Hadley cell's poleward boundary. Considering only the conservation of angular momentum, a parcel of air at rest along the equator would accelerate to a zonal speed of 134 m/s (480 km/h; 300 mph) by the time it reached 30° latitude. However, small-scale turbulence along the parcel's poleward trek and large-scale eddies in the mid-latitude dissipate angular momentum. The jet associated with the Southern Hemisphere Hadley cell is stronger than its northern counterpart due to the stronger intensity of the Southern Hemisphere cell. The cooler, higher latitudes leads to cooling of air parcels, which causes the poleward air to eventually descend. When the movement of air is averaged annually, the descending branch of the Hadley cell is located roughly over the 25th parallel north and the 25th parallel south. The moisture in the subtropics is then partly advected poleward by eddies and partly advected equatorward by the lower branch of the Hadley cell, where it is later brought towards the ITCZ. Although the zonally averaged Hadley cell is organized into four main branches, these branches are aggregations of more concentrated air flows and regions of mass transport.

Several theories and physical models have attempted to explain the latitudinal width of the Hadley cell. The Held–Hou Model provides one theoretical constraint on the meridional extent of the Hadley cells. By assuming a simplified atmosphere composed of a lower layer subject to friction from the Earth's surface and an upper layer free from friction, the model predicts that the Hadley circulation would be restricted to within 2,500 km (1,600 mi) of the equator if parcels do not have any net heating within the circulation. According to the Held–Hou Model, the latitude of the Hadley cell's poleward edge $\phi$ scales according to

$$\phi \propto \sqrt{\frac{g \Delta \theta H_t}{\Omega^2 a^2 \theta_0}}$$

where $\Delta\theta$ is the difference in potential temperature between the equator and the pole in radiative equilibrium, $H_t$ is the height of the tropopause, $\Omega$ is the Earth's rotation rate, and $\theta_0$ is a reference potential temperature. Other compatible models posit that the width of the Hadley cell may scale with other physical parameters such as the vertically averaged Brunt–Väisälä frequency in the tropopshere or the growth rate of baroclinic waves shed by the cell.

=== Seasonality and variability ===
Annual and monthly average Stokes stream function based on 1991–2020 values from the NCEP/NCAR Reanalysis; the Hadley cells are the two counterrotating cells adjacent to the equator

The Hadley circulation varies considerably with seasonal changes. Around the equinox during the spring and autumn for either the northern or southern hemisphere, the Hadley circulation takes the form of two relatively weaker Hadley cells in both hemispheres, sharing a common region of ascent over the ITCZ and moving air aloft towards each cell's respective hemisphere. However, closer to the solstices, the Hadley circulation transitions into a more singular and stronger cross-equatorial Hadley cell with air rising in the summer hemisphere and broadly descending in the winter hemisphere. The transition between the two-cell and single-cell configuration is abrupt, and during most of the year the Hadley circulation is characterized by a single dominant Hadley cell that transports air across the equator. In this configuration, the ascending branch is located in the tropical latitudes of the warmer summer hemisphere and the descending branch is positioned in the subtropics of the cooler winter hemisphere. Two cells are still present in each hemisphere, though the winter hemisphere's cell becomes much more prominent while the summer hemisphere's cell becomes displaced poleward. The intensification of the winter hemisphere's cell is associated with a steepening of gradients in geopotential height, leading to an acceleration of trade winds and stronger meridional flows. The presence of continents relaxes temperature gradients in the summer hemisphere, accentuating the contrast between the hemispheric Hadley cells. Reanalysis data from 1979 to 2001 indicated that the dominant Hadley cell in boreal summer extended from 13°S to 31°N on average. (Note: Boreal and austral refer to the Northern and Southern Hemisphere, respectively. For example, boreal summer refers to summer in the Northern Hemisphere, which occurs concurrently with austral winter (winter in the Southern Hemisphere).) In both boreal and austral winters, the Indian Ocean and the western Pacific Ocean contribute most to the rising and sinking motions in the zonally averaged Hadley circulation. However, vertical flows over Africa and the Americas are more marked in boreal winter.

At longer interannual timescales, variations in the Hadley circulation are associated with variations in the El Niño–Southern Oscillation (ENSO), which impacts the positioning of the ascending branch; the response of the circulation to ENSO is non-linear, with a more marked response to El Niño events than La Niña events. During El Niño, the Hadley circulation strengthens due to the increased warmth of the upper troposphere over the tropical Pacific and the resultant intensification of poleward flow. However, these changes are not asymmetric, during the same events, the Hadley cells over the western Pacific and the Atlantic are weakened. During the Atlantic Niño, the circulation over the Atlantic is intensified. The Atlantic circulation is also enhanced during periods when the North Atlantic oscillation is strongly positive. The variation in the seasonally averaged and annually averaged Hadley circulation from year to year is largely accounted for by two juxtaposed modes of oscillation: an equatorial symmetric mode characterized by single cell straddling the equator and an equatorial symmetric mode characterized by two cells on either side of the equator.

=== Energetics and transport ===
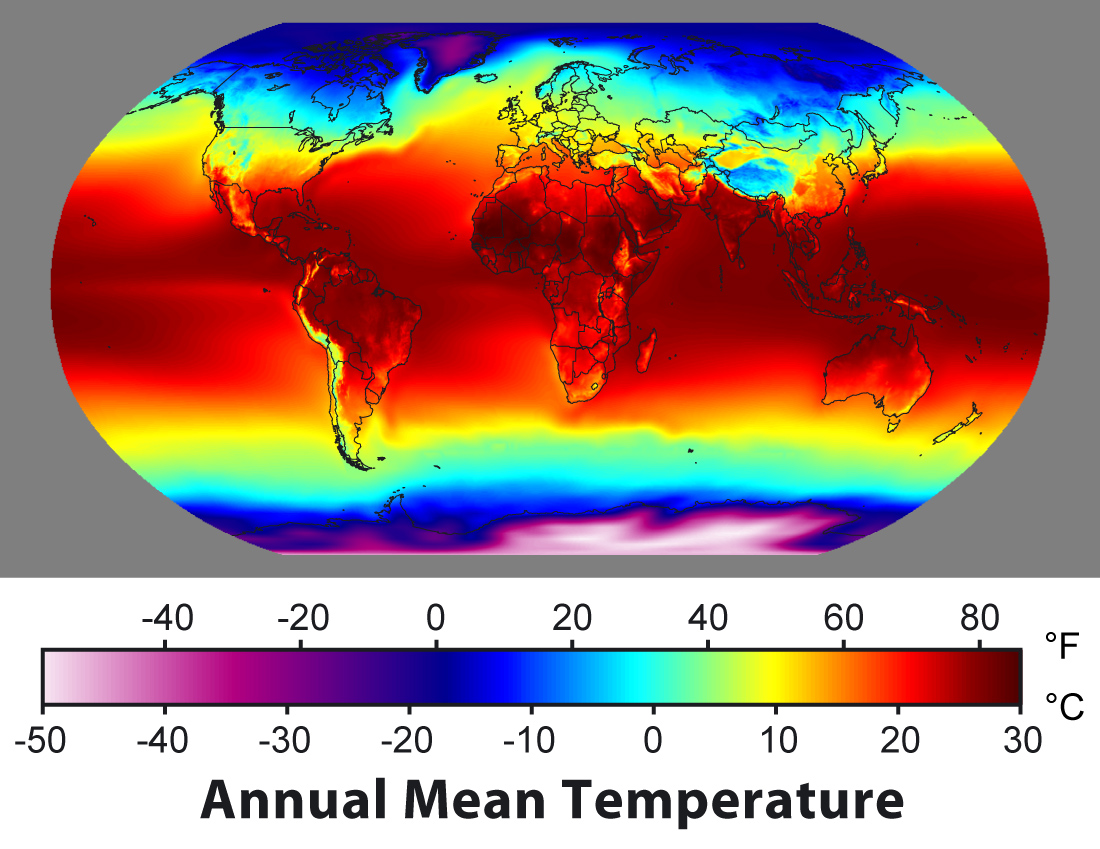
The Hadley cell redistributes heat, counteracting the uneven heating of the Earth.

The Hadley cell is an important mechanism by which moisture and energy are transported both between the tropics and subtropics and between the Northern and Southern hemispheres. However, it is not an efficient transporter of energy due to the opposing flows of the lower and upper branch, with the lower branch transporting sensible and latent heat equatorward and the upper branch transporting potential energy poleward. The resulting net energy transport poleward represents around 10 percent of the overall energy transport involved in the Hadley cell. The descending branch of the Hadley cell generates clear skies and a surplus of evaporation relative to precipitation in the subtropics. The lower branch of the Hadley circulation accomplishes most of the transport of the excess water vapor accumulated in the subtropical atmosphere towards the equatorial region. The strong Southern Hemisphere Hadley cell relative to its northern counterpart leads to a small net energy transport from the northern to the southern hemisphere; as a result, the transport of energy at the equator is directed southward on average, with an annual net transport of around 0.1 PW. In contrast to the higher latitudes where eddies are the dominant mechanism for transporting energy poleward, the meridional flows imposed by the Hadley circulation are the primary mechanism for poleward energy transport in the tropics. As a thermally direct circulation, the Hadley circulation converts available potential energy to the kinetic energy of horizontal winds. Based on data from January 1979 and December 2010, the Hadley circulation has an average power output of 198 TW, with maxima in January and August and minima in May and October. Although the stability of the tropopause largely limits the movement of air from the troposphere to the stratosphere, some tropospheric air penetrates into the stratosphere via the Hadley cells.

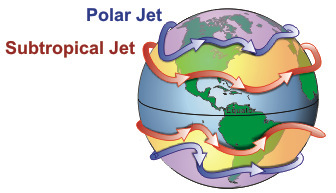
Baroclinic waves developing along the subtropical jet at the polar boundaries of Hadley cells transport energy polewards.

The Hadley circulation may be idealized as a heat engine converting heat energy into mechanical energy. As air moves towards the equator near the Earth's surface, it accumulates entropy from the surface either by direct heating or the flux of sensible or latent heat. In the ascending branch of a Hadley cell, the ascent of air is approximately an adiabatic process with respect to the surrounding environment. However, as parcels of air move equatorward in the cell's upper branch, they lose entropy by radiating heat to space at infrared wavelengths and descend in response. This radiative cooling occurs at a rate of at least 60 W m^{−2} and may exceed 100 W m^{−2} in winter. The heat accumulated during the equatorward branch of the circulation is greater than the heat lost in the upper poleward branch; the excess heat is converted into the mechanical energy that drives the movement of air. This difference in heating also results in the Hadley circulation transporting heat poleward as the air supplying the Hadley cell's upper branch has greater moist static energy than the air supplying the cell's lower branch. Within the Earth's atmosphere, the timescale at which air parcels lose heat due to radiative cooling and the timescale at which air moves along the Hadley circulation are at similar orders of magnitude, allowing the Hadley circulation to transport heat despite cooling in the circulation's upper branch. Air with high potential temperature is ultimately moved poleward in the upper troposphere while air with lower potential temperature is brought equatorward near the surface. As a result, the Hadley circulation is one mechanism by which the disequilibrium produced by uneven heating of the Earth is brought towards equilibrium. When considered as a heat engine, the thermodynamic efficiency of the Hadley circulation averaged around 2.6 percent between 1979 and 2010, with small seasonal variability.

The Hadley circulation also transports planetary angular momentum poleward due to Earth's rotation. Because the trade winds are directed opposite the Earth's rotation, eastward angular momentum is transferred to the atmosphere via frictional interaction between the winds and topography. The Hadley cell then transfers this angular momentum through its upward and poleward branches. The poleward branch accelerates and is deflected east in both the Northern and Southern hemispheres due to the Coriolis force and the conservation of angular momentum, resulting in a zonal jet stream above the descending branch of the Hadley cell. The formation of such a jet implies the existence of a thermal wind balance supported by the amplification of temperature gradients in the jet's vicinity resulting from the Hadley circulation's poleward heat advection. The subtropical jet in the upper troposphere coincides with where the Hadley cell meets the Ferrel cell. The strong wind shear accompanying the jet presents a significant source of baroclinic instability from which waves grow; the growth of these waves transfers heat and momentum polewards. Atmospheric eddies extract westerly angular momentum from the Hadley cell and transport it downward, resulting in the mid-latitude westerly winds.

== Formulation and discovery ==
The broad structure and mechanism of the Hadley circulation—comprising convective cells moving air due to temperature differences in a manner influenced by the Earth's rotation—was first proposed by Edmund Halley in 1685 and George Hadley in 1735. Hadley had sought to explain the physical mechanism for the trade winds and the westerlies; the Hadley circulation and the Hadley cells are named in honor of his pioneering work. Although Hadley's ideas invoked physical concepts that would not be formalized until well after his death, his model was largely qualitative and without mathematical rigor. Hadley's formulation was later recognized by most meteorologists by the 1920s to be a simplification of more complicated atmospheric processes. The Hadley circulation may have been the first attempt to explain the global distribution of winds in Earth's atmosphere using physical processes. However, Hadley's hypothesis could not be verified without observations of winds in the upper atmosphere. Data collected by routine radiosondes beginning in the mid-20th century confirmed the existence of the Hadley circulation.

=== Early explanations of the trade winds ===
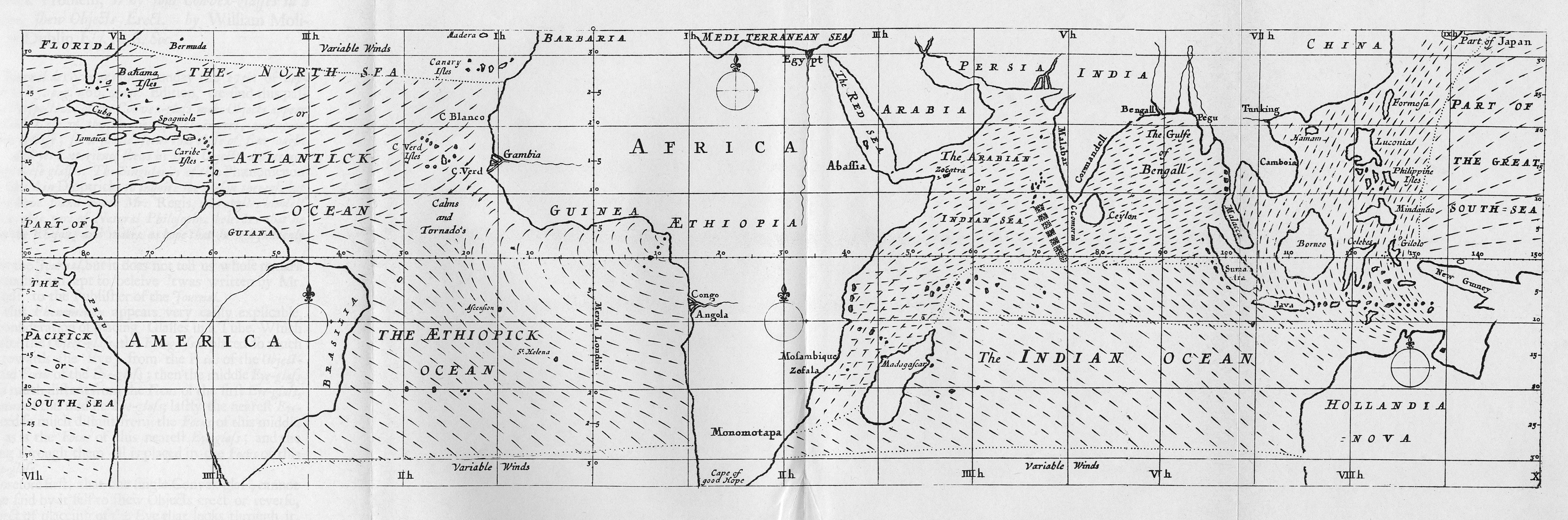
Attempts to explain the trade winds were motivated by their steadiness and importance to maritime trade.

In the 15th and 16th centuries, observations of maritime weather conditions were of considerable importance to maritime transport. Compilations of these observations showed consistent weather conditions from year to year and significant seasonal variability. The prevalence of dry conditions and weak winds at around 30° latitude and the equatorward trade winds closer to the equator, mirrored in the Northern and Southern hemispheres, was apparent by 1600. Early efforts by scientists to explain aspects of global wind patterns often focused on the trade winds as the steadiness of the winds was assumed to portend a simple physical mechanism. Galileo Galilei proposed that the trade winds resulted from the atmosphere lagging behind the Earth's faster tangential rotation speed in the low latitudes, resulting in the westward trades directed opposite of Earth's rotation.

In 1685, English polymath Edmund Halley proposed at a debate organized by the Royal Society that the trade winds resulted from east to west temperature differences produced over the course of a day within the tropics. In Halley's model, as the Earth rotated, the location of maximum heating from the Sun moved west across the Earth's surface. This would cause air to rise, and by conservation of mass, Halley argued that air would be moved to the region of evacuated air, generating the trade winds. Halley's hypothesis was criticized by his friends, who noted that his model would lead to changing wind directions throughout the course of a day rather than the steady trade winds. Halley conceded in personal correspondence with John Wallis that "Your questioning my hypothesis for solving the Trade Winds makes me less confident of the truth thereof". Nonetheless, Halley's formulation was incorporated into Chambers's Encyclopaedia and La Grande Encyclopédie, becoming the most widely known explanation for the trade winds until the early 19th century. Though his explanation of the trade winds was incorrect, Halley correctly predicted that the surface trade winds should be accompanied by an opposing flow aloft following mass conservation.

=== George Hadley's explanation ===
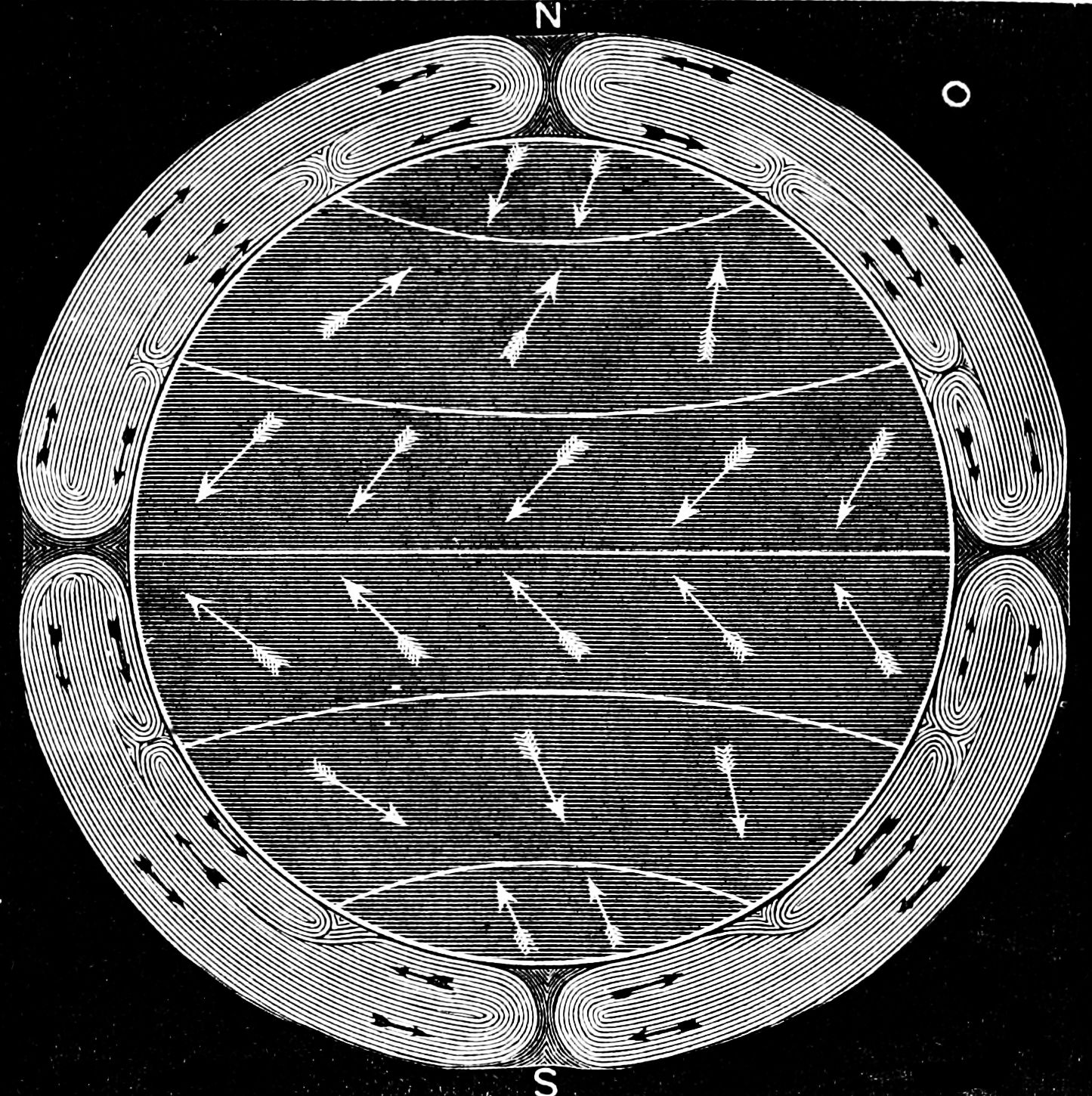
Hadley's conception of the atmospheric circulation involved large, hemisphere-spanning circulations

Unsatisfied with preceding explanations for the trade winds, George Hadley proposed an alternate mechanism in 1735. Hadley's hypothesis was published in the paper "On the Cause of the General Trade Winds" in Philosophical Transactions of the Royal Society. Like Halley, Hadley's explanation viewed the trade winds as a manifestation of air moving to take the place of rising warm air. However, the region of rising air prompting this flow lay along the lower latitudes. Understanding that the tangential rotation speed of the Earth was fastest at the equator and slowed farther poleward, Hadley conjectured that as air with lower momentum from higher latitudes moved equatorward to replace the rising air, it would conserve its momentum and thus curve west. By the same token, the rising air with higher momentum would spread poleward, curving east and then sinking as it cooled to produce westerlies in the mid-latitudes. Hadley's explanation implied the existence of hemisphere-spanning circulation cells in the Northern and Southern hemispheres extending from the equator to the poles, though he relied on an idealization of Earth's atmosphere that lacked seasonality or the asymmetries of the oceans and continents. His model also predicted rapid easterly trade winds of around 37 m/s (130 km/h; 83 mph), though he argued that the action of surface friction over the course of a few days slowed the air to the observed wind speeds. Colin Maclaurin extended Hadley's model to the ocean in 1740, asserting that meridional ocean currents were subject to similar westward or eastward deflections.

Hadley was not widely associated with his theory due to conflation with his older brother, John Hadley, and Halley; his theory failed to gain much traction in the scientific community for over a century due to its unintuitive explanation and the lack of validating observations. Several other natural philosophers independently forwarded explanations for the global distribution of winds soon after Hadley's 1735 proposal. In 1746, Jean le Rond d'Alembert provided a mathematical formulation for global winds, but disregarded solar heating and attributed the winds to the gravitational effects of the Sun and Moon. Immanuel Kant, also unsatisfied with Halley's explanation for the trade winds, published an explanation for the trade winds and westerlies in 1756 with similar reasoning as Hadley. In the latter part of the 18th century, Pierre-Simon Laplace developed a set of equations establishing a direct influence of Earth's rotation on wind direction. Swiss scientist Jean-André Deluc published an explanation of the trade winds in 1787 similar to Hadley's hypothesis, connecting differential heating and the Earth's rotation with the direction of the winds.

English chemist John Dalton was the first to clearly credit Hadley's explanation of the trade winds to George Hadley, mentioning Hadley's work in his 1793 book Meteorological Observations and Essays. In 1837, Philosophical Magazine published a new theory of wind currents developed by Heinrich Wilhelm Dove without reference to Hadley but similarly explaining the direction of the trade winds as being influenced by the Earth's rotation. In response, Dalton later wrote a letter to the editor to the journal promoting Hadley's work. Dove subsequently credited Hadley so frequently that the overarching theory became known as the "Hadley–Dove principle", popularizing Hadley's explanation for the trade winds in Germany and Great Britain.

=== Critique of Hadley's explanation ===
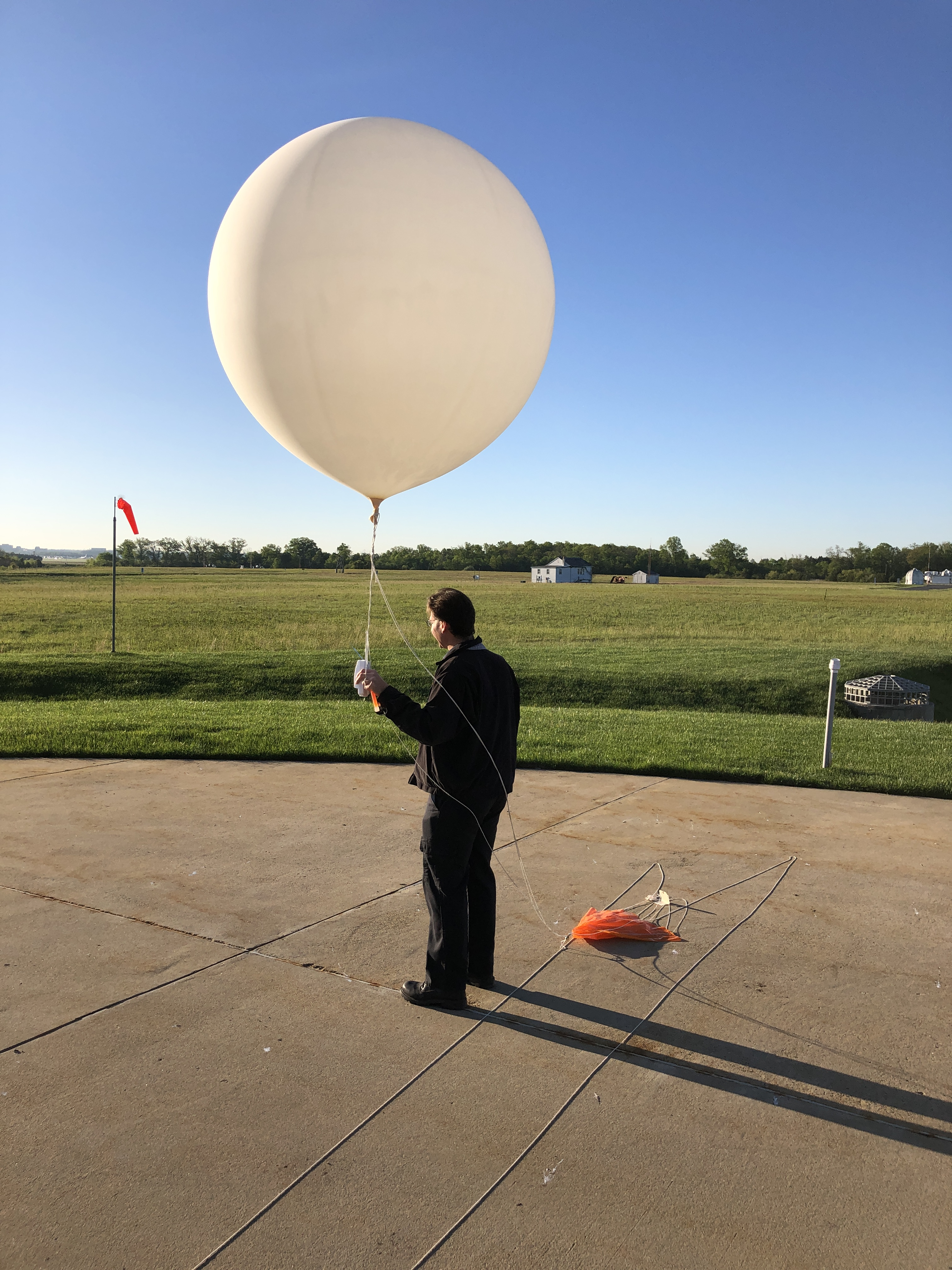
Routine radiosonde samples of the upper troposphere beginning in the 20th century provided the first direct observational evidence of the Hadley circulation.

The work of Gustave Coriolis, William Ferrel, Jean Bernard Foucault and Henrik Mohn in the 19th century helped establish the Coriolis force as the mechanism for the deflection of winds due to Earth's rotation, emphasizing the conservation of angular momentum in directing flows rather than the conservation of linear momentum as Hadley suggested; Hadley's assumption led to an underestimation of the deflection by a factor of two. The acceptance of the Coriolis force in shaping global winds led to debate among German atmospheric scientists beginning in the 1870s over the completeness and validity of Hadley's explanation, which narrowly explained the behavior of initially meridional motions. Hadley's use of surface friction to explain why the trade winds were much slower than his theory would predict was seen as a key weakness in his ideas. The southwesterly motions observed in cirrus clouds at around 30°N further discounted Hadley's theory as their movement was far slower than the theory would predict when accounting for the conservation of angular momentum. In 1899, William Morris Davis, a professor of physical geography at Harvard University, gave a speech at the Royal Meteorological Society criticizing Hadley's theory for its failure to account for the transition of an initially unbalanced flow to geostrophic balance. Davis and other meteorologists in the 20th century recognized that the movement of air parcels along Hadley's envisaged circulation was sustained by a constant interplay between the pressure gradient and Coriolis forces rather than the conservation of angular momentum alone. Ultimately, while the atmospheric science community considered the general ideas of Hadley's principle valid, his explanation was viewed as a simplification of more complex physical processes.

Hadley's model of the global atmospheric circulation being characterized by hemisphere-wide circulation cells was also challenged by weather observations showing a zone of high pressure in the subtropics and a belt of low pressure at around 60° latitude. This pressure distribution would imply a poleward flow near the surface in the mid-latitudes rather than an equatorward flow implied by Hadley's envisioned cells. Ferrel and James Thomson later reconciled the pressure pattern with Hadley's model by proposing a circulation cell limited to lower altitudes in the mid-latitudes and nestled within the broader, hemisphere-wide Hadley cells. Carl-Gustaf Rossby proposed in 1947 that the Hadley circulation was limited to the tropics, forming one part of a dynamically driven and multi-celled meridional flow. Rossby's model resembled that of a similar three-celled model developed by Ferrel in 1860.

=== Direct observation ===
The three-celled model of the global atmospheric circulation—with Hadley's conceived circulation forming its tropical component—had been widely accepted by the meteorological community by the early 20th century. However, the Hadley cell's existence was only validated by weather observations near the surface, and its predictions of winds in the upper troposphere remained untested. The routine sampling of the upper troposphere by radiosondes that emerged in the mid-20th century confirmed the existence of meridional overturning cells in the atmosphere.

== Influence on climate ==
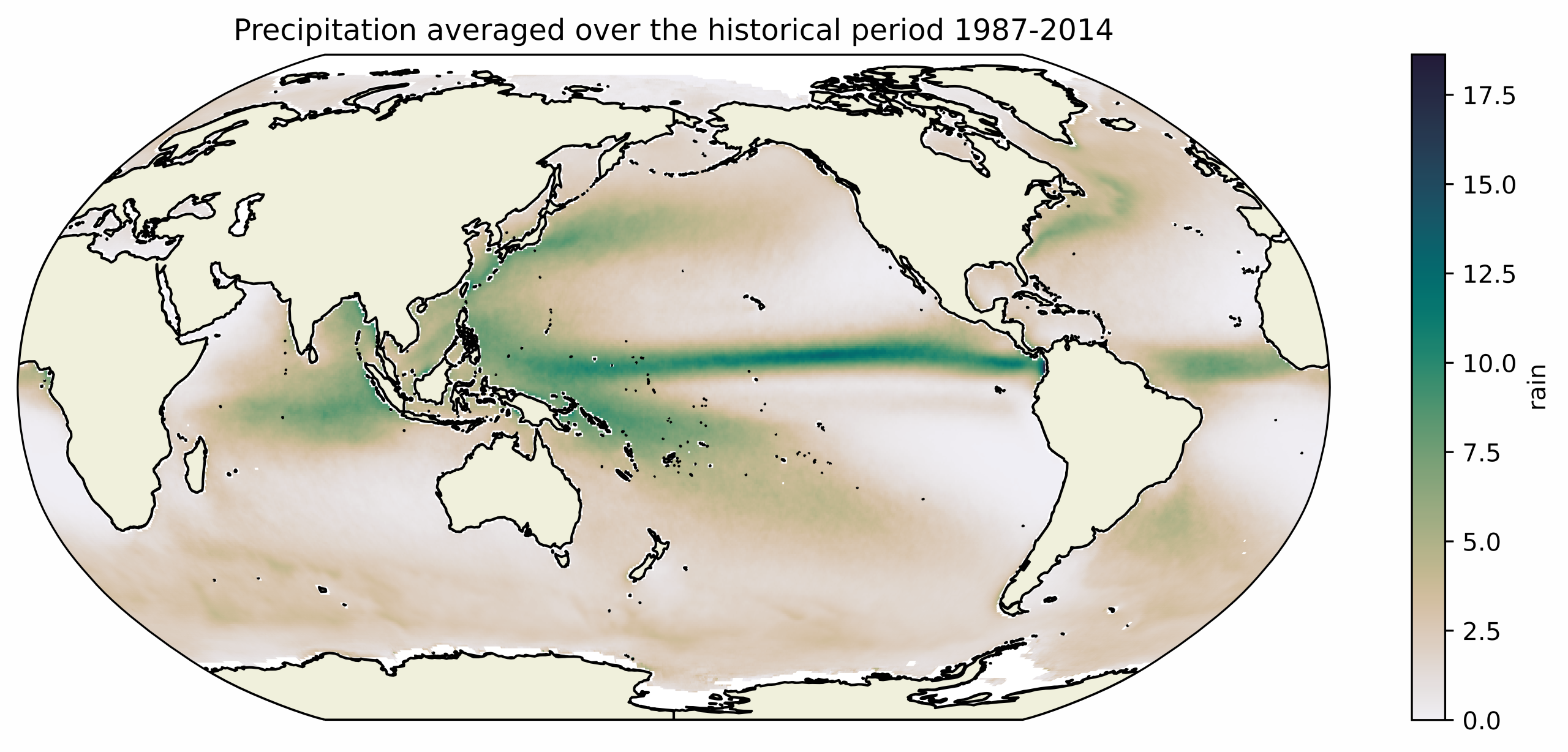
The global distribution of precipitation in the tropics is strongly influenced by the Hadley circulation

The Hadley circulation is one of the most important influences on global climate and planetary habitability, as well as an important transporter of angular momentum, heat and water vapor. Hadley cells flatten the temperature gradient between the equator and the poles, making the extratropics milder. The global precipitation pattern of high precipitation in the tropics and a lack of precipitation at higher latitudes is a consequence of the positioning of the rising and sinking branches of Hadley cells, respectively. Near the equator, the ascent of humid air results in the heaviest precipitation on Earth. The periodic movement of the ITCZ and thus the seasonal variation of the Hadley circulation's rising branches produces the world's monsoons. The descending motion of air associating with the sinking branch produces surface divergence consistent with the prominence of subtropical high-pressure areas. These semipermanent regions of high pressure lie primarily over the ocean between 20° and 40° latitude. Arid conditions are associated with the descending branches of the Hadley circulation, with many of the Earth's deserts and semiarid or arid regions underlying the sinking branches of the Hadley circulation.

The cloudy marine boundary layer common in the subtropics may be seeded by cloud condensation nuclei exported out of the tropics by the Hadley circulation.

== Effects of climate change ==
=== Natural variability ===
Paleoclimate reconstructions of trade winds and rainfall patterns suggest that the Hadley circulation changed in response to natural climate variability. During Heinrich events within the last 100,000 years, the Northern Hemisphere Hadley cell strengthened while the Southern Hemisphere Hadley cell weakened. Variation in insolation during the mid-to-late Holocene resulted in a southward migration of the Northern Hemisphere Hadley cell's ascending and descending branches closer to their present-day positions. Tree rings from the mid-latitudes of the Northern Hemisphere suggest that the historical position of the Hadley cell branches have also shifted in response to shorter oscillations, with the Northern Hemisphere descending branch moving southward during positive phases of the El Niño–Southern Oscillation and Pacific decadal oscillation and northward during the corresponding negative phases. The Hadley cells were displaced southward between 1400 and 1850, concurrent with drought in parts of the Northern Hemisphere.

=== Hadley cell expansion and intensity changes ===
==== Observed trends ====
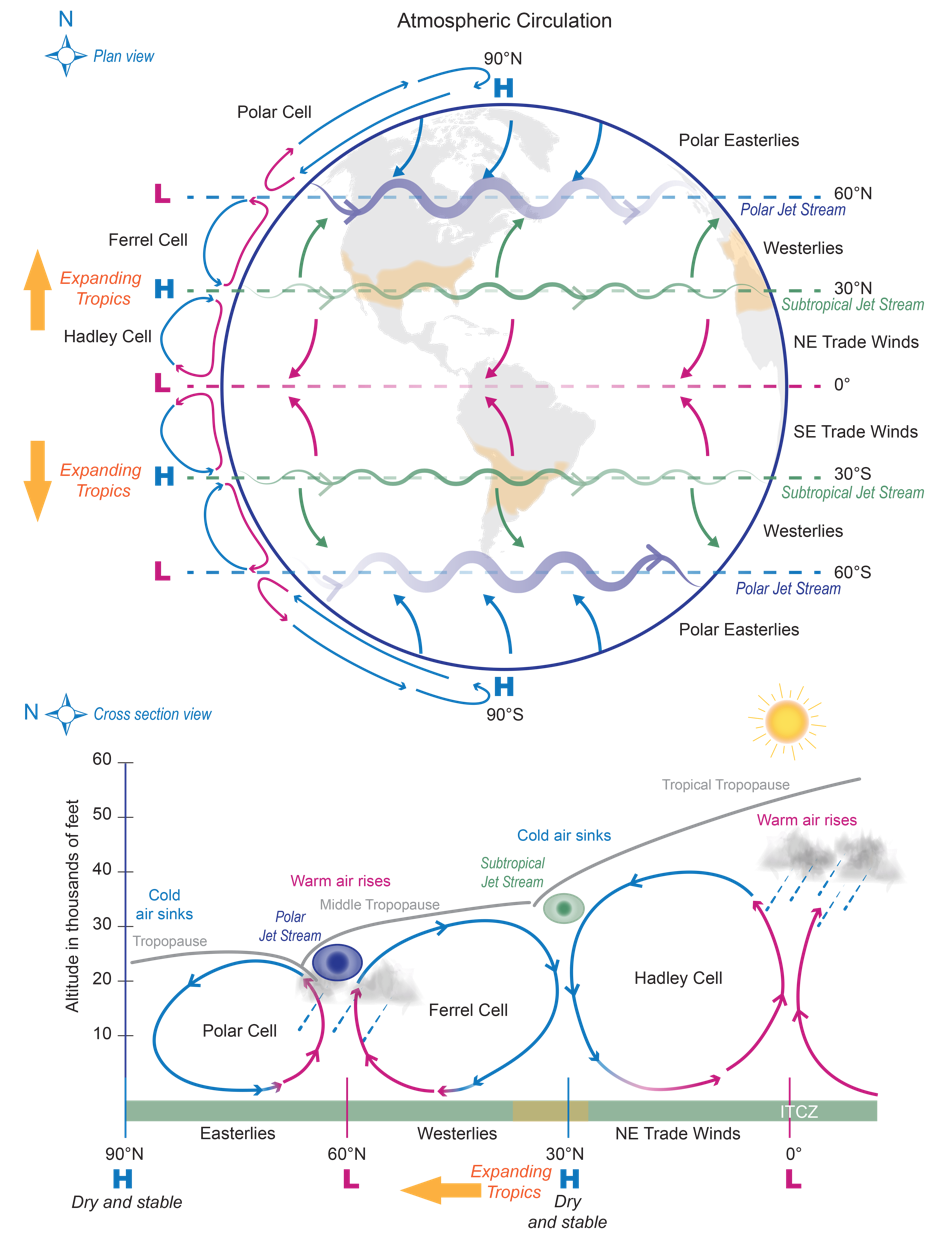
Climate change has led to the poleward expansion of the Hadley circulation.

According to the IPCC Sixth Assessment Report (AR6), the Hadley circulation has likely expanded since at least the 1980s in response to climate change, with medium confidence in an accompanying intensification of the circulation. An expansion of the overall circulation poleward by about 0.1°–0.5° latitude per decade since the 1980s is largely accounted for by the poleward shift of the Northern Hemisphere Hadley cell, which in atmospheric reanalysis has shown a more marked expansion since 1992. However, the AR6 also reported medium confidence in the expansion of the Northern Hemisphere Hadley cell being within the range of internal variability. In contrast, the AR6 assessed that it was likely that the Southern Hemisphere Hadley cell's poleward expansion was due to anthropogenic influence; this finding was based on CMIP5 and CMIP6 climate models.

Studies have produced a large range of estimates for the rate of widening of the tropics due to the use of different metrics; estimates based on upper-tropospheric properties tend to yield a wider range of values. The degree to which the circulation has expanded varies by season, with trends in summer and autumn being larger and statistically significant in both hemispheres. The widening of the Hadley circulation has also resulted in a likely widening of the ITCZ since the 1970s. Reanalyses also suggest that the summer and autumn Hadley cells in both hemispheres have widened and that the global Hadley circulation has intensified since 1979, with a more pronounced intensification in the Northern Hemisphere. Between 1979 and 2010, the power generated by the global Hadley circulation increased by an average of 0.54 TW per year, consistent with an increased input of energy into the circulation by warming SSTs over the tropical oceans. (For comparison, the Hadley circulation's overall power ranges from 0.5 TW to 218 TW throughout the year in the Northern Hemisphere and from 32 to 204 TW in the Southern.) In contrast to reanalyses, CMIP5 climate models depict a weakening of the Hadley circulation since 1979. The magnitude of long-term changes in the circulation strength are thus uncertain due to the influence of large interannual variability and the poor representation of the distribution of latent heat release in reanalyses.

The expansion of the Hadley circulation due to climate change is consistent with the Held–Hou Model, which predicts that the latitudinal extent of the circulation is proportional to the square root of the height of the tropopause. Warming of the troposphere raises the tropopause height, enabling the upper poleward branch of the Hadley cells to extend farther and leading to an expansion of the cells. Results from climate models suggest that the impact of internal variability (such as from the Pacific decadal oscillation) and the anthropogenic influence on the expansion of the Hadley circulation since the 1980s have been comparable. Human influence is most evident in the expansion of the Southern Hemisphere Hadley cell; the AR6 assessed medium confidence in associating the expansion of the Hadley circulation in both hemispheres with the added radiative forcing of greenhouse gasses.

==== Physical mechanisms and projected changes ====
The physical processes by which the Hadley circulation expands by human influence are unclear but may be linked to the increased warming of the subtropics relative to other latitudes in both the Northern and Southern hemispheres. The enhanced subtropical warmth could enable expansion of the circulation poleward by displacing the subtropical jet and baroclinic eddies poleward. Poleward expansion of the Southern Hemisphere Hadley cell in the austral summer was attributed by the IPCC Fifth Assessment Report (AR5) to stratospheric ozone depletion based on CMIP5 model simulations, while CMIP6 simulations have not shown as clear of a signal. Ozone depletion could plausibly affect the Hadley circulation through the increase of radiative cooling in the lower stratosphere; this would increase the phase speed of baroclinic eddies and displace them poleward, leading to expansion of Hadley cells. Other eddy-driven mechanisms for expanding Hadley cells have been proposed, involving changes in baroclinicity, wave breaking and other releases of instability. In the extratropics of the Northern Hemisphere, increasing concentrations of black carbon and tropospheric ozone may be a major forcing on that hemisphere's Hadley cell expansion in boreal summer.

Projections from climate models indicate that a continued increase in the concentration of greenhouse gas would result in continued widening of the Hadley circulation. However, simulations using historical data suggest that forcing from greenhouse gasses may account for about 0.1° per decade of expansion of the tropics. Although the widening of the Hadley cells due to climate change has occurred concurrent with an increase in their intensity based on atmospheric reanalyses, climate model projections generally depict a weakening circulation in tandem with a widening circulation by the end of the 21st century. A longer-term increase in the concentration of carbon dioxide may lead to a weakening of the Hadley circulation as a result of the reduction of radiative cooling in the troposphere near the circulation's sinking branches. However, changes in the oceanic circulation within the tropics may attenuate changes in the intensity and width of the Hadley cells by reducing thermal contrasts.

=== Changes to weather patterns ===
Changes in the Hadley cell due to climate change may influence global precipitation trends.

The expansion of the Hadley circulation due to climate change is connected to changes in regional and global weather patterns. A widening of the tropics could displace the tropical rain belt, expand subtropical deserts, and exacerbate wildfires and drought. The documented shift and expansion of subtropical ridges are associated with changes in the Hadley circulation, including a westward extension of the subtropical high over the northwestern Pacific, changes in the intensity and position of the Azores High, and the poleward displacement and intensification of the subtropical high pressure belt in the Southern Hemisphere. These changes have influenced regional precipitation amounts and variability, including drying trends over southern Australia, northeastern China and northern South Asia. The AR6 assessed limited evidence that the expansion of the Northern Hemisphere Hadley cell may have led in part to drier conditions in the subtropics and a poleward expansion of aridity during boreal summer. Precipitation changes induced by Hadley circulation changes may lead to changes in regional soil moisture, with modelling showing the most significant declines in the Mediterranean Sea, South Africa and the Southwestern United States. However, the concurrent effects of changing surface temperature patterns over land lead to uncertainties over the influence of Hadley cell broadening on drying over subtropical land areas.

Climate modelling suggests that the shift in the position of the subtropical highs induced by Hadley cell broadening may reduce oceanic upwelling at low latitudes and enhance oceanic upwelling at high latitudes. The expansion of subtropical highs in tandem with the circulation's expansion may also entail a widening of oceanic regions of high salinity and low marine primary production. A decline in extratropical cyclones in the storm track regions in model projections is partly influenced by Hadley cell expansion. Poleward shifts in the Hadley circulation are associated with shifts in the paths of tropical cyclones in the Northern and Southern hemispheres, including a poleward trend in the locations where storms attained their peak intensity.

== Extraterrestrial Hadley circulations ==
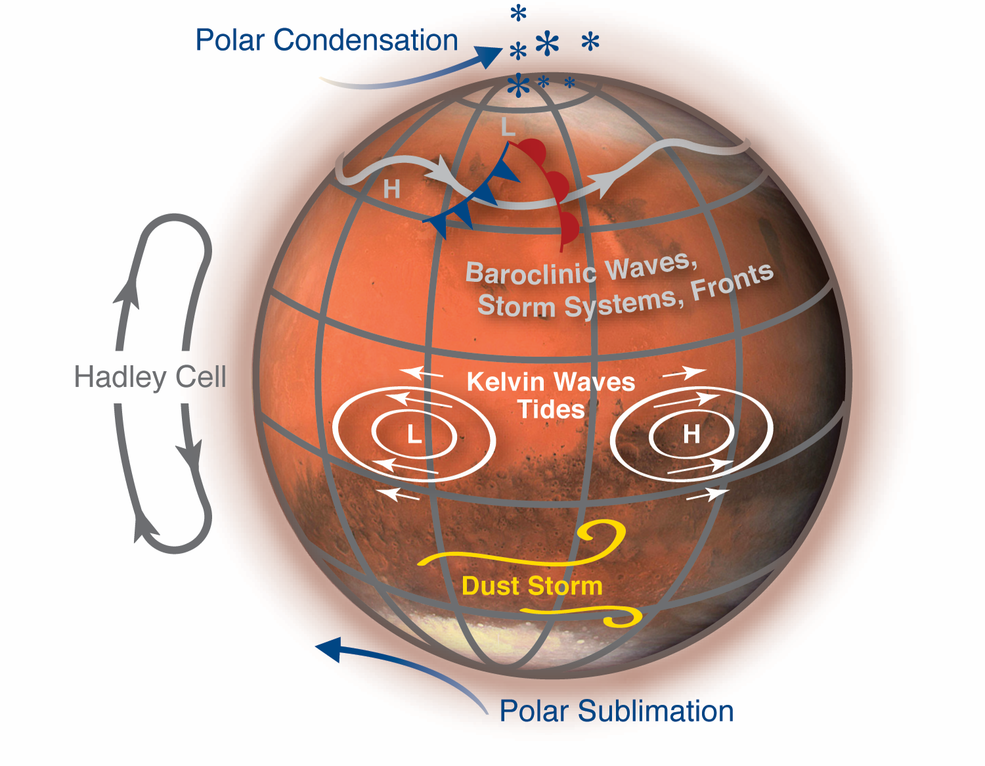
A Hadley circulation may be present on other planets, including Mars.

Outside of Earth, any thermally direct circulation that circulates air meridionally across planetary-scale gradients of insolation may be described as a Hadley circulation. A terrestrial atmosphere subject to excess equatorial heating tends to maintain an axisymmetric Hadley circulation with rising motions near the equator and sinking at higher latitudes. Differential heating is hypothesized to result in Hadley circulations analogous to Earth's on other atmospheres in the Solar System, such as on Venus, Mars and Titan. As with Earth's atmosphere, the Hadley circulation would be the dominant meridional circulation for these extraterrestrial atmospheres. Though less understood, Hadley circulations may also be present on the gas giants of the Solar System and should in principle materialize on exoplanetary atmospheres. The spatial extent of a Hadley cell on any atmosphere may be dependent on the rotation rate of the planet or moon, with a faster rotation rate leading to more contracted Hadley cells (with a more restrictive poleward extent) and a more cellular global meridional circulation. The slower rotation rate reduces the Coriolis effect, thus reducing the meridional temperature gradient needed to sustain a jet at the Hadley cell's poleward boundary and thus allowing the Hadley cell to extend farther poleward.

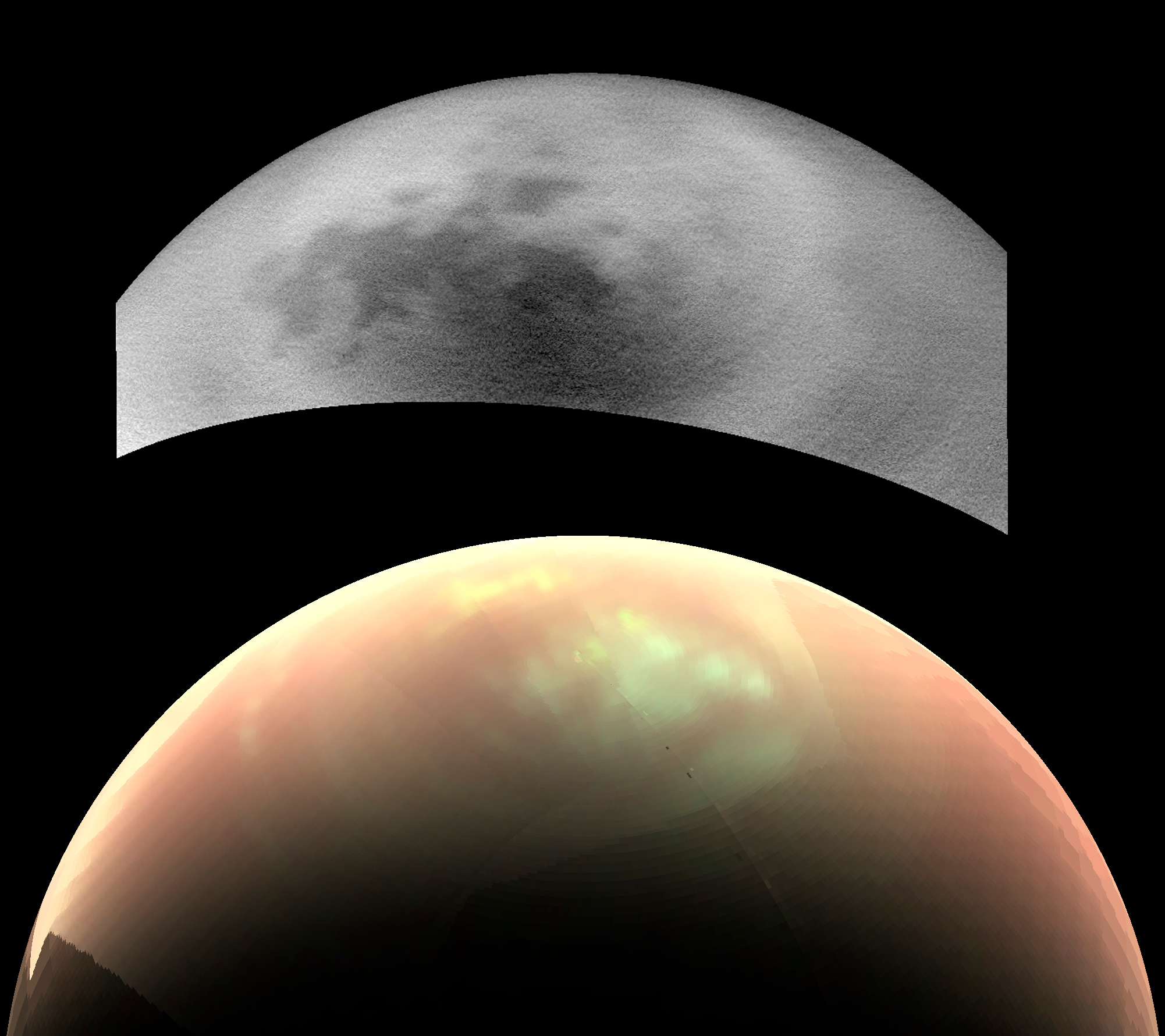
Slower rotating planets or moons, such as on Titan, may support broader Hadley circulations with upward branches and convection closer to the polar regions.

Venus, which rotates slowly, may have Hadley cells that extend farther poleward than Earth's, spanning from the equator to high latitudes in each of the Northern and Southern hemispheres. Its broad Hadley circulation would efficiently maintain the nearly isothermal temperature distribution between the planet's pole and equator and vertical velocities of around 0.5 cm/s (0.018 km/h; 0.011 mph). Observations of chemical tracers such as carbon monoxide provide indirect evidence for the existence of the Venusian Hadley circulation. The presence of poleward winds with speeds up to around 15 m/s (54 km/h; 34 mph) at an altitude of 65 km (40 mi) are typically understood to be associated with the upper branch of a Hadley cell, which may be located 50–65 km (31–40 mi) above the Venusian surface. The slow vertical velocities associated with the Hadley circulation have not been measured, though they may have contributed to the vertical velocities measured by Vega and Venera missions. The Hadley cells may extend to around 60° latitude, equatorward of a mid-latitude jet stream demarcating the boundary between the hypothesized Hadley cell and the polar vortex. The planet's atmosphere may exhibit two Hadley circulations, with one near the surface and the other at the level of the upper cloud deck. The Venusian Hadley circulation may contribute to the super-rotation of the planet's atmosphere.

Simulations of the Martian atmosphere suggest that a Hadley circulation is also present in Mars' atmosphere, exhibiting a stronger seasonality compared to Earth's Hadley circulation. This greater seasonality results from diminished thermal inertia resulting from the lack of an ocean and the planet's thinner atmosphere. Additionally, Mars' orbital eccentricity leads to a stronger and wider Hadley cell during its northern winter compared to its southern winter. During most of the Martian year, when a single Hadley cell prevails, its rising and sinking branches are located at 30° and 60° latitude, respectively, in global climate modelling. The tops of the Hadley cells on Mars may reach higher (to around 60 km [37 mi] altitude) and be less defined compared to on Earth due to the lack of a strong tropopause on Mars. While latent heating from phase changes associated with water drive much of the ascending motion in Earth's Hadley circulation, ascent in Mars' Hadley circulation may be driven by radiative heating of lofted dust and intensified by the condensation of carbon dioxide near the polar ice cap of Mars' wintertime hemisphere, steepening pressure gradients. Over the course of the Martian year, the mass flux of the Hadley circulation ranges between 10^{9} kg s^{−1} during the equinoxes and 10^{10} at the solstices.

A Hadley circulation may also be present in the atmosphere of Saturn's moon Titan. Like Venus, the slow rotation rate of Titan may support a spatially broad Hadley circulation. General circulation modeling of Titan's atmosphere suggests the presence of a cross-equatorial Hadley cell. This configuration is consistent with the meridional winds observed by the Huygens spacecraft when it landed near Titan's equator. During Titan's solstices, its Hadley circulation may take the form of a single Hadley cell that extends from pole to pole, with warm gas rising in the summer hemisphere and sinking in the winter hemisphere. A two-celled configuration with ascent near the equator is present in modelling during a limited transitional period near the equinoxes. The distribution of convective methane clouds on Titan and observations from Huygens spacecraft suggest that the rising branch of its Hadley circulation occurs in the mid-latitudes of its summer hemisphere. Frequent cloud formation occurs at 40° latitude in Titan's summer hemisphere from ascent analogous to Earth's ITCZ.

== See also ==
- Atlantic meridional overturning circulation – a broad oceanic circulation important for energy exchange across a wide range of latitudes
- Brewer–Dobson circulation – a circulation between the tropical troposphere and the stratosophere
- Polar vortex – a broad semi-permanent region of cold, cyclonically rotating air encircling Earth's poles
