= Hypsometric =

Hypsometric is a scientific term relating to the measurement of heights. The term originates from the Greek word ὕψος "hypsos" meaning height and the word metre is from the Greek μέτρον (métron), "a measure".

- Hypsometric curve is a histogram of elevations of a landscape
- Hypsometric equation relates pressure to height in the atmosphere
- Hypsometric tints are a technique of showing elevation on maps

A Hypsometer is an instrument for measuring altitude using the boiling point of a liquid.
