= James Henry Coffin =

American meteorologist (1806–1873)

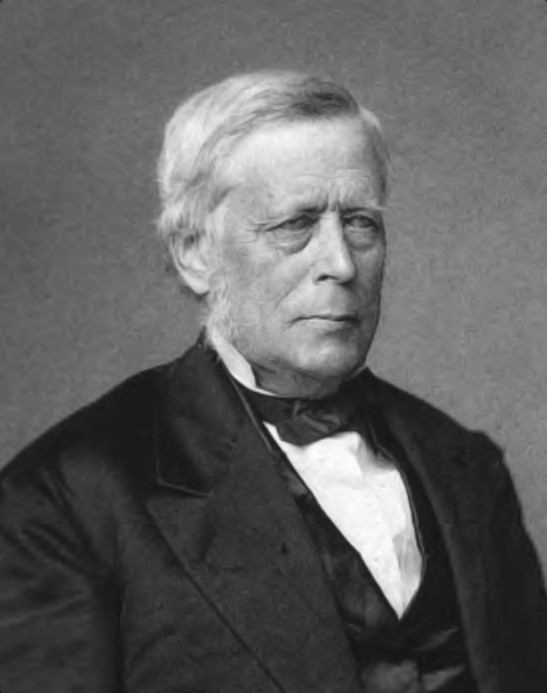
- Born: September 6, 1806; Williamsburg, Massachusetts
- Died: February 6, 1873 (aged 66); Easton, Pennsylvania
- Known for: Pioneer of wind theory; co-deducer of Buys Ballot's law (with William Ferrel)
- Scientific career
- Fields: Mathematics, meteorology

James Henry Coffin (September 6, 1806 – February 6, 1873) was an American mathematician and meteorologist.

== Biography ==
=== Life ===
Coffin was born on September 6, 1806, in Williamsburg, Massachusetts. He was descended from Tristram Coffin, the first owner of Nantucket Island. Coffin was an orphan, and was raised by his uncle, the Reverend Moses Hallock. He attended Amherst College in Amherst, Massachusetts, from where he graduated in 1828. He had a son, Selden J. Coffin. He died in Easton, Pennsylvania on February 6, 1873.

=== Career ===
After graduating from Amherst, Coffin became a teacher at various schools and colleges. His career in meteorology began in 1838. He worked at Williams College in Williamstown, Massachusetts, from 1840 to 1843, during which he installed an apparatus for detecting the wind's direction and velocity, atop Mount Greylock, the highest point in Massachusetts. Together with William Ferrel, he deduced the Buys Ballot's law, which was named after the Dutch meteorologist C. H. D. Buys Ballot. He collaborated on meteorological studies with the Smithsonian Institution beginning in 1846. That same year, he acquired a chair at Lafayette College in Easton, Pennsylvania, in mathematics and natural philosophy, a position he held until his death. Also, while at Lafayette, he served as treasurer to the board of trustees from 1863 to 1873.

== Contributions to meteorology ==
Coffin made significant contributions to contemporaneous studies of winds. He is most noted for two publications: Winds of the Northern Hemisphere and The Winds of the Globe. Winds of the Northern Hemisphere was commissioned by the American Association for the Advancement of Science in an attempt to help predict the occurrence of storms. The second, also commissioned by the American Association for the Advancement of Science, was meant to extend the work of the previous publication in light of increased interest from agricultural, engineering, and manufacturing interests. Ultimately, both were published by the Smithsonian Institution, and provided novel theoretical contributions and a wealth of tabulated raw data for use by others. Finally, it is worth noting that much of The Winds of the Globe was written posthumously. Coffin gathered the data, but died before any detailed analysis could be made of them; Coffin's coworker, Dr. Alexander J. Woeikof performed that analysis instead.

=== The Winds of the Northern Hemisphere ===
==== Data ====
In this book, Coffin aggregates measurements of the "lower strata"—any wind directly measurable by weather vane, windmill or other ground-based apparatus—from 579 stations across the Northern Hemisphere. The distribution of these stations, as well as the sum of the duration of measurements at each station is shown in Table 1.

Table 1: Winds of the Northern Hemisphere Data
Region	Number of Stations	Sum of Duration of Measurements in years
United States	367	1694
Europe	169	936
Asia	25	49.5
Africa	4	<1
Ocean/Islands	18	136
West Indies and South America	9	5.5
Total	579	~2821

From each station, Coffin aggregated five measurements: the mean direction of wind, its mean speed, mean rate of change over the course of the year, direction and amount of "deflecting forces" that caused such changes, and the ratio of time spent blowing in the direction of the points of the compass. The resulting data set comprises almost 160 pages of tables, sectioned by measurement and subsequently by region. Subsets of this data are also visualized in charts such as Figure 1.

==== Analysis ====
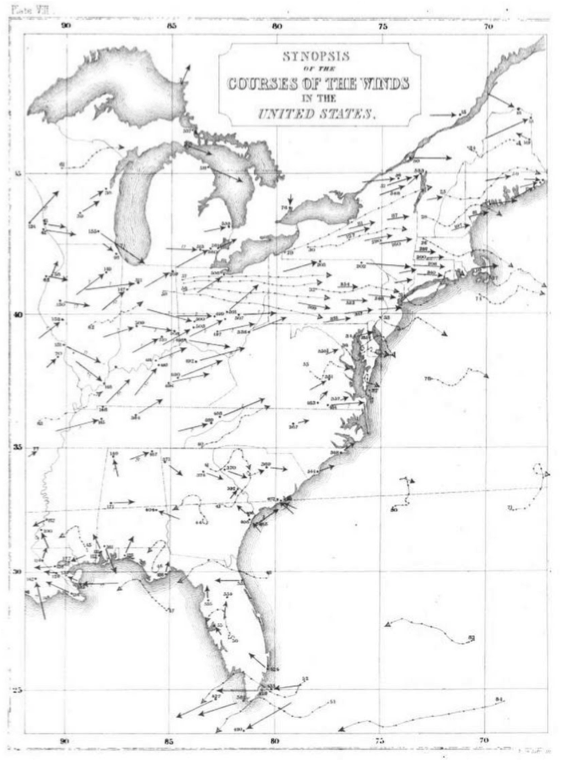
Figure 1: An example of a visualization in The Winds of the Northern Hemisphere

From this Coffin draws several general conclusions. First, Coffin was able to establish the existence of two of the three trade winds, the southwesterly band around 60° latitude, and the northeasterly band above it. He then unified two contemporary theories of global wind systems in order to explain the phenomena. Second, Coffin correlates the prevalence of monsoons with seasonal temperature differences caused by difference between the relatively stable temperature of large bodies of water, and the much less stable temperature of landmasses. Third, by the same principle, Coffin notes that lakes significantly disrupt wind flow. Coffin believes he can then straightforwardly claim that, though there are two prevailing trade winds, their course can, and often is, diverted by landmasses and smaller bodies of water.

The remainder of the book is spent discussing particular phenomena, and explaining them in terms of the above general principles. It also includes an appendix with excerpts of scientific correspondence that Coffin deemed relevant.

==== Limitations and criticism ====
The most prominent criticism of The Winds of the Northern Hemisphere was its relatively sparse coverage outside the US and Europe; this ultimately became one of the motivation for writing The Winds of the Globe. Coffin also notes two other methodological issues. First, measurements of velocity were sometimes estimated qualitatively on a 1-10 scale. Second, since cloud height can only be estimated as well, what constitutes the "lower strata" is not entirely clear—especially when differences between upper and lower strata were apparent.

=== The Winds of the Globe ===
==== Data ====
Table 2: The Winds of the Globe Data
Region	Number of Stations	Sum of Durations of Measurements in years
The Americas	2077	12380
Europe	740	4130
Asia	244	496
Africa	76	131
Islands of the Sea	86	314
Total	3223	Over 18500^{^{[1]}}

The Winds of the Globe had a much more expansive data set than its predecessor. In this book, Coffin aggregates measurements of the "lower strata" from 3223 stations across the world. A summary of the distribution of these stations, as well as the sum of the duration of measurements at each station is reproduced in Table 2.

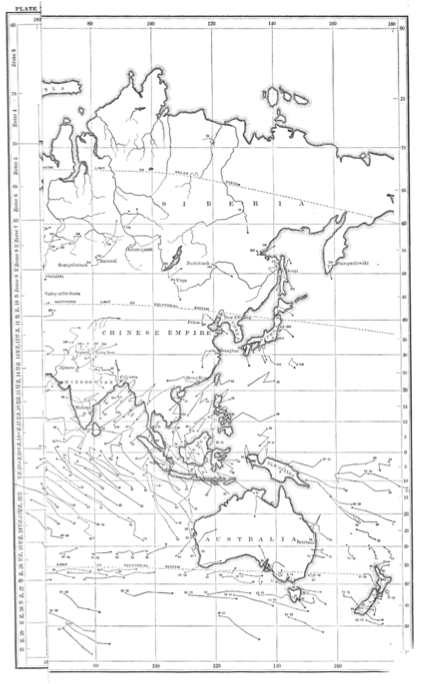
Figure 2: An example of a visualization in The Winds of the Globe

In this case Coffin took six measurements: the mean direction of the lower currents, the ratio that the progressive motion bears to the total distance travelled, modifications that the mean current undergoes in the different seasons of the year, the directions of the forces that cause those modifications, the magnitude of those forces, and finally to show, how and to what degree the winds of the lower strata differ from the higher winds. The resulting volume includes over 650 pages of results, again tabulated by parameter and subsequently region. As before, certain subsets are visualized and presented, as exemplified in Figure 2.

==== Analysis ====
The data in The Winds of the Globe leads to conclusions that generally agree with those of its predecessor. Woeikof confirms the existence of the two trade winds found above 30° latitude, and established the existence of a third, southwesterly band between 0°-30° latitude. The greater wealth of data also allows Woeikof to give a more accurately describe the extent of these winds, each of the three spanning 30° latitude from the equator on top of the other. Another novel contribution was the realization that these wind bands shift with the seasons. When the sun is in its zenith over the northern hemisphere (our summer) the equatorial band moves northward, as do all the others. The reverse happens in our winter.

The Winds of the Globe also made significant progress towards empirically verifying the current theoretical association of the effect of air pressure on the direction of winds, as well as precisifying the previously poorly quantified relationship between pressure gradients and wind velocity. Contrarily, it served to problematize Hadley's contemporaneous theory about the movement of the upper atmosphere, and the effect of gravity on the shape of convection cells.

Woeikof then applied these general conclusions to particular instances. Most notably, he was able to explain the mechanism behind the dry and wet seasons of Asia and Australia, as well as their corresponding monsoons. Woeikof was also able to use the effect of landmasses on wind currents to explain the difference in climate between Asia and North America based on the differing geographies of the two regions.

== Reception/legacy ==
As stated in his The Winds of the Globe, Winds of the Northern Hemisphere was not received well due to its spotty coverage of Asia, the Oceans, and Central America. However, NOAA still calls The Winds of the Northern Hemisphere a "most important work" in the history of meteorology. Additionally, the Smithsonian Institution called Wind of the Northern Hemisphere "an important addition to meteorology." Finally, Winds of the Northern Hemisphere was given out as a reference book to the first sergeants of the US weather service.

Coffin's more universally acclaimed contributions to meteorology began with his Winds of the Globe, which helped pick out flaws in the prevailing theory by Hadley. Ferrel used Coffin's data to confirm theories of about the "general circulation of the atmosphere." Indeed, Landsbergh, 1964 credits Coffin's data as being foundational to the creation of mathematical climatology. Youmans argues that Northern Hemisphere was the first to establish that there are three large circulation cells in the Northern, and then later the Southern, hemispheres. This, in combination with Coffin's derivation Buys-Ballot's law, found in another piece, lead Youmans to go so far as to say that Coffin's results "have been referred to in all the treatises on meteorology which have appeared since their publication, and they have been employed with other materials as the basis of the wind-charts of the Atlantic and Pacific oceans, prepared and published by the English Board of Trade." The Smithsonian institution calls Coffin one of four people to make significant contributions to "one of the most important additions to meteorology of the present day…the establishment of the dependence of the force and direction of the wind upon the pressure of the atmosphere at different points." Henry, the leader of the Smithsonian Institution, called The Winds of the Globe "perhaps the most important contribution to knowledge which the institution has given to the world."
