= Temporary Academy =

From Temporary Academy was a temporary institution for higher education in the southern Netherlands at the end of the Second World War. The academy was founded in Eindhoven at the beginning of 1945 following the allied liberation of the south of the Netherlands at the end of 1944.

The purpose of the Temporary Academy was, among other things, to train academics for the Philips Physics Laboratory: all universities and colleges with programs in the exact sciences and engineering sciences were located in the then still occupied north of the Netherlands. On 26 February 1945, after approval by the Dutch government in exile, the Temporary Academy foundation in Eindhoven was formally established, with Balthasar van der Pol as chairman. Rector was Hendrik Casimir.

Excluded were students who had signed the loyalty declaration in 1943 that was demanded of students in occupied Netherlands at the time (an exception was possible for students who had signed but had not continued their studies).

The academy remained active even after the liberation of the whole of the Netherlands in May 1945, but by December of that year, the other universities had resumed their regular programs. This eliminated the need for the Temporary Academy, and it was closed. It would not be until 1956 that the Eindhoven University of Technology was established, giving Eindhoven a university institution again.
