= James Coffin =

James Coffin may refer to:

- James Coffin, member of the Coffin whaling family
- James Henry Coffin (1806–1873), American mathematician and meteorologist
