= Coriolis force =

Apparent force in a rotating reference frame

In the inertial frame of reference (upper part of the picture), the black ball moves in a straight line. However, the observer (red dot) who is standing in the rotating/non-inertial frame of reference (lower part of the picture) sees the object as following a curved path due to the Coriolis and centrifugal forces present in this frame.

In physics, the Coriolis force is a pseudo-force that acts on objects in motion within a frame of reference that rotates with respect to an inertial frame. In a reference frame with clockwise rotation, the force acts to the left of the motion of the object. In one with anticlockwise (or counterclockwise) rotation, the force acts to the right. Deflection of an object due to the Coriolis force is called the Coriolis effect. Though recognized previously by others, the mathematical expression for the Coriolis force appeared in an 1835 paper by French scientist Gaspard-Gustave de Coriolis, in connection with the theory of water wheels. Early in the 20th century, the term Coriolis force began to be used in connection with meteorology. On Earth, the Coriolis force will affect the movement of air and water over long distance. Because of Earth's rotation, the moving object does not travel in a straight line relative to the Earth's surface but follows a curved path. This deflection (clockwise in the Northern Hemisphere and counterclockwise in the Southern Hemisphere) significantly influences large-scale circulation of winds and ocean currents.

In popular (non-technical) usage of the term "Coriolis effect", the rotating reference frame implied is almost always the Earth. Because the Earth rotates, Earth-bound observers need to account for the Coriolis force to correctly analyze the motion of objects. The Earth completes one rotation for each sidereal day, so for motions of everyday objects the Coriolis force is imperceptible; its effects become noticeable only for motions occurring over large distances and long periods of time, such as large-scale movement of air in the atmosphere or water in the ocean, or where high precision is important, such as artillery or missile trajectories. Such motions are constrained by the surface of the Earth, so only the horizontal component of the Coriolis force is generally important. This force causes moving objects on the surface of the Earth to be deflected to the right (with respect to the direction of travel) in the Northern Hemisphere and to the left in the Southern Hemisphere. The horizontal deflection effect is greater near the poles, since the effective rotation rate about a local vertical axis is largest there, and decreases to zero at the equator. Rather than flowing directly from areas of high pressure to low pressure, as they would in a non-rotating system, winds and currents tend to flow to the right of this direction north of the equator ("clockwise") and to the left of this direction south of it ("anticlockwise"). This effect is responsible for the rotation and thus formation of cyclones.

== History ==
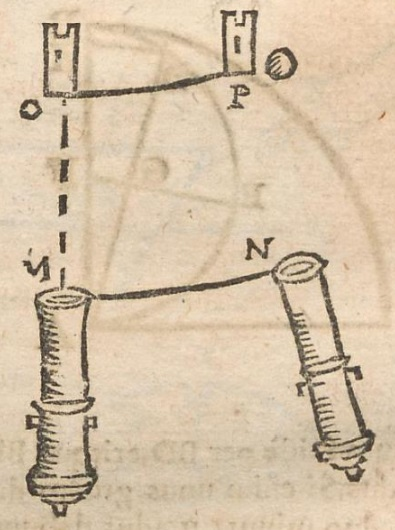
Image from Cursus seu Mundus Mathematicus (1674) of C.F.M. Dechales, showing how a cannonball should deflect to the right of its target on a rotating Earth, because the rightward motion of the ball is faster than that of the tower.

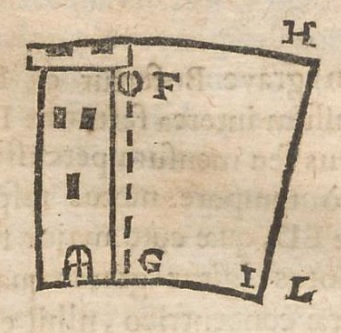
Image from Cursus seu Mundus Mathematicus (1674) of C.F.M. Dechales, showing how a ball should fall from a tower on a rotating Earth. The ball is released from F. The top of the tower moves faster than its base, so while the ball falls, the base of the tower moves to I, but the ball, which has the eastward speed of the tower's top, outruns the tower's base and lands further to the east at L.

Italian scientist Giovanni Battista Riccioli and his assistant Francesco Maria Grimaldi described the effect in connection with artillery in the 1651 Almagestum Novum, writing that rotation of the Earth should cause a cannonball fired to the north to deflect to the east. In 1674, Claude François Milliet Dechales described in his Cursus seu Mundus Mathematicus how the rotation of the Earth should cause a deflection in the trajectories of both falling bodies and projectiles aimed toward one of the planet's poles. Riccioli, Grimaldi, and Dechales all described the effect as part of an argument against the heliocentric system of Copernicus. In other words, they argued that the Earth's rotation should create the effect, and so failure to detect the effect was evidence for an immobile Earth. Their arguments were correct, but the effect of Coriolis force is so small that it was not measured until the 19th century. The Coriolis acceleration equation was derived by Euler in 1749, and the effect was described in the tidal equations of Pierre-Simon Laplace in 1778.

Gaspard-Gustave de Coriolis published a paper in 1835 on the energy yield of machines with rotating parts, such as waterwheels. That paper considered the supplementary forces that are detected in a rotating frame of reference. Coriolis divided these supplementary forces into two categories. The second category contained a force that arises from the cross product of the angular velocity of a coordinate system and the projection of a particle's velocity into a plane perpendicular to the system's axis of rotation. Coriolis referred to this force as the "compound centrifugal force" due to its analogies with the centrifugal force already considered in category one. The effect was known in the early 20th century as the "acceleration of Coriolis", and by 1920 as "Coriolis force".

In 1856, William Ferrel proposed the existence of a circulation cell in the mid-latitudes with air being deflected by the Coriolis force to create the prevailing westerly winds.

The understanding of the kinematics of how exactly the rotation of the Earth affects airflow was partial at first. Late in the 19th century, the full extent of the large scale interaction of pressure-gradient force and deflecting force that in the end causes air masses to move along isobars was understood.

== Formulation ==
Newton's laws of motion describe the motion of an object in an inertial (non-accelerating) frame of reference. When Newton's laws are transformed to a rotating frame of reference, the Coriolis and centrifugal accelerations appear. When applied to objects with masses, the respective forces are proportional to their masses. The magnitude of the Coriolis force is proportional to the rotation rate, and the magnitude of the centrifugal force is proportional to the square of the rotation rate. The Coriolis force acts in a direction perpendicular to two quantities: the angular velocity of the rotating frame relative to the inertial frame and the velocity of the body relative to the rotating frame, and its magnitude is proportional to the object's speed in the rotating frame (more precisely, to the component of its velocity that is perpendicular to the axis of rotation). The centrifugal force acts outwards in the radial direction and is proportional to the distance of the body from the axis of the rotating frame. These additional forces are termed inertial forces, fictitious forces, or pseudo forces. By introducing these fictitious forces to a rotating frame of reference, Newton's laws of motion can be applied to the rotating system as though it were an inertial system; these forces are correction factors that are not required in a non-rotating system.

In Newtonian mechanics, the equation of motion for an object in an inertial reference frame is:
$$\mathbf{F} = m\mathbf{a}$$
where $\mathbf F$ is the vector sum of the physical forces acting on the object, $m$ is the mass of the object, and $\mathbf a$ is the acceleration of the object relative to the inertial reference frame.

Transforming this equation to a reference frame rotating about a fixed axis through the origin with angular velocity $\boldsymbol{\omega}$ having variable rotation rate, the equation takes the form:
$$\begin{align}
\mathbf{F'} &=
\mathbf{F} - m\frac{\mathrm{d} \boldsymbol{\omega}}{\mathrm{d}t}\times\mathbf{r}' - 2m \boldsymbol{\omega}\times \mathbf{v}' - m\boldsymbol{\omega} \times (\boldsymbol{\omega} \times \mathbf{r}')  \\
& = m\mathbf{a}'
\end{align}$$
where the prime (') variables denote coordinates in the rotating reference frame (not a derivative) and:

- $\mathbf F$ is the vector sum of the physical forces acting on the object
- $\boldsymbol{\omega}$ is the angular velocity of the rotating reference frame relative to the inertial frame
- $\mathbf r '$ is the position vector of the object relative to the rotating reference frame
- $\mathbf v '$ is the velocity of the object relative to the rotating reference frame
- $\mathbf a '$ is the acceleration of the object relative to the rotating reference frame

The fictitious forces as they are perceived in the rotating frame act as additional forces that contribute to the apparent acceleration just like the real external forces. The fictitious force terms of the equation are, reading from left to right:

- Euler force, $-m \frac{\mathrm{d}\boldsymbol{\omega}}{\mathrm{d}t} \times\mathbf{r}'$
- Coriolis force, $-2m ( \boldsymbol{\omega} \times \mathbf{v}')$
- centrifugal force, $-m\boldsymbol{\omega} \times (\boldsymbol{\omega} \times \mathbf{r}')$

As seen in these formulas the Euler and centrifugal forces depend on the position vector $\mathbf r '$ of the object, while the Coriolis force depends on the object's velocity $\mathbf v '$ as measured in the rotating reference frame. As expected, for a non-rotating inertial frame of reference $(\boldsymbol\omega=0)$ the Coriolis force and all other fictitious forces disappear.

=== Direction of Coriolis force for simple cases ===
Since the Coriolis force is proportional to the cross product of two vectors, namely, the object's velocity vector and the frame's angular velocity vector, it is always perpendicular to both. When the object velocity vector is itself parallel or orthogonal to the angular velocity vector, especially simple cases arise. These cases can be exemplified by an object on Earth's equator that moves either horizontally exactly along a cardinal direction (North, South, East, or West) or vertically up or down:

- if the object velocity is parallel or antiparallel to the rotation axis, the Coriolis force is zero. On Earth's equator this corresponds to moving horizontally north or south.
- if the object velocity is straight inward to the axis, the Coriolis force is in the direction of local rotation. On Earth's equator, this corresponds to a body falling downwards, as in the Dechales illustration above, with the falling body deviating eastward.
- if the object velocity is straight outward from the axis, the Coriolis force is against the direction of local rotation. In the tower example, a ball launched upward would deviate westward.
- if the object velocity is tangential along local rotation, the Coriolis force is directed outward from the axis. On Earth's equator, a body traveling east will deviate upwards. If the motion is confined to the horizontal surface, the body's apparent weight will decrease. This effect (see Eötvös effect below) was discussed by Galileo Galilei in 1632 and by Riccioli in 1651.
- if the object velocity is tangential and opposite to local rotation, the Coriolis force is inward to the axis. On Earth's equator, a body traveling west will deviate downwards. When confined to horizontal movement, the body's apparent weight will increase.

== Intuitive explanation ==
For an intuitive explanation of the origin of the Coriolis force, consider an object moving northward on the ground in the Northern Hemisphere. Viewed from outer space, the object does not appear to go due north, but has an eastward motion (it rotates around toward the right along with the surface of the Earth). The further north it travels, the smaller the "radius of its parallel (latitude)" (the minimum distance from the surface point to the axis of rotation, which is in a plane orthogonal to the axis), and so the slower the eastward motion of its surface. As the object moves north it has a tendency to maintain the eastward speed it started with (rather than slowing down to match the reduced eastward speed of local objects on the Earth's surface), so it veers east (i.e. to the right of its initial motion).

Though not obvious from this example, which considers northward motion, the horizontal deflection occurs equally for objects moving eastward or westward (or in any other direction). However, the theory that the effect determines the rotation of draining water in a household bathtub, sink or toilet has been repeatedly disproven by modern-day scientists; the force is negligibly small compared to the many other influences on the rotation.

== Length scales and the Rossby number ==
The time, space, and velocity scales are important in determining the importance of the Coriolis force. Whether rotation is important in a system can be determined by its Rossby number (Ro), which is the ratio of the velocity, U, of a system to the product of the Coriolis parameter, $f = 2 \omega \sin \varphi \$ with $\omega$ the angular rotation rate, $\varphi$ the latitude, and the length scale, L, of the motion:
$$\mathrm{Ro} = \frac{U}{fL}.$$
Hence, it is the ratio of inertial to Coriolis forces; a small Rossby number indicates a system is strongly affected by Coriolis forces, and a large Rossby number indicates a system in which inertial forces dominate. For example, in tornadoes, the Rossby number is large, so the Coriolis force is negligible; the balance is between pressure and centrifugal forces. In low-pressure systems the Rossby number is low, as the centrifugal force is negligible; the balance is between Coriolis and pressure forces. In oceanic systems the Rossby number is often around 1, with all three forces comparable.

An atmospheric system moving at U = 10 m/s (22 mph) occupying a spatial distance of L = 1,000 km (621 mi), has a Rossby number of approximately 0.1.

An unguided missile can travel far enough and be in the air long enough to experience the effect of Coriolis force. Long-range shells in the Northern Hemisphere can land to the right of where they were aimed until the effect was noted (those fired in the Southern Hemisphere landed to the left.) It was this effect that first drew the attention of Coriolis himself.

== Simple cases ==
=== Tossed ball on a rotating carousel ===
Left Figure: The trajectory of a ball thrown from the edge of a rotating disc, as seen by an external observer. Because of the rotation, the ball has both an initial tangential velocity and a radial velocity given by the thrower. These velocities bring it to the right of the center. Right Figure: The trajectory of a ball thrown from the edge of a rotating disc, as seen by the thrower, the rotating observer. It is deviating from the straight line.

The figures illustrate a ball tossed from 12:00 o'clock toward the center of a counter-clockwise rotating carousel. In the first figure, the ball is seen by a stationary observer above the carousel, and the ball travels in a straight line slightly to the right of the center, because it had an initial tangential velocity given by the rotation (blue arrow) and a radial velocity given by the thrower (green arrow). The resulting combined velocity is shown as a solid red line, and the trajectory is shown as a dotted red line. In the second figure, the ball is seen by an observer rotating with the carousel, so the ball-thrower appears to stay at 12:00 o'clock, and the ball trajectory has a slight curve.

=== Bounced ball ===
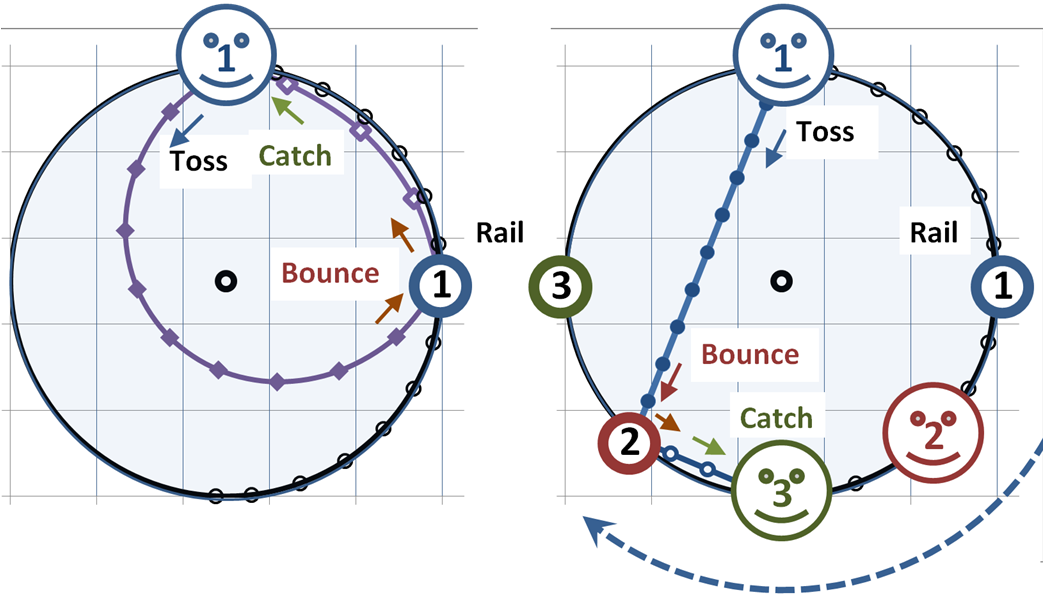
Bird's-eye view of carousel. The carousel rotates clockwise. Two viewpoints are illustrated: that of the camera at the center of rotation rotating with the carousel (left panel) and that of the inertial (stationary) observer (right panel). Both observers agree at any given time just how far the ball is from the center of the carousel, but not on its orientation. Time intervals are 1/10 of time from launch to bounce.

The figure describes a more complex situation where the tossed ball on a turntable bounces off the edge of the carousel and then returns to the tosser, who catches the ball. The effect of Coriolis force on its trajectory is shown again as seen by two observers: an observer (referred to as the "camera") that rotates with the carousel, and an inertial observer. The figure shows a bird's-eye view based upon the same ball speed on forward and return paths. Within each circle, plotted dots show the same time points. In the left panel, from the camera's viewpoint at the center of rotation, the tosser (smiley face) and the rail both are at fixed locations, and the ball makes a very considerable arc on its travel toward the rail, and takes a more direct route on the way back. From the ball tosser's viewpoint, the ball seems to return more quickly than it went (because the tosser is rotating toward the ball on the return flight).

On the carousel, instead of tossing the ball straight at a rail to bounce back, the tosser must throw the ball toward the right of the target and the ball then seems to the camera to bear continuously to the left of its direction of travel to hit the rail (left because the carousel is turning clockwise). The ball appears to bear to the left from direction of travel on both inward and return trajectories. The curved path demands this observer to recognize a leftward net force on the ball. (This force is "fictitious" because it disappears for a stationary observer, as is discussed shortly.) For some angles of launch, a path has portions where the trajectory is approximately radial, and Coriolis force is primarily responsible for the apparent deflection of the ball (centrifugal force is radial from the center of rotation, and causes little deflection on these segments). When a path curves away from radial, however, centrifugal force contributes significantly to deflection.

The ball's path through the air is straight when viewed by observers standing on the ground (right panel). In the right panel (stationary observer), the ball tosser (smiley face) is at 12 o'clock and the rail the ball bounces from is at position 1. From the inertial viewer's standpoint, positions 1, 2, and 3 are occupied in sequence. At position 2, the ball strikes the rail, and at position 3, the ball returns to the tosser. Straight-line paths are followed because the ball is in free flight, so this observer requires that no net force is applied.

== Applied to the Earth ==
The acceleration affecting the motion of air "sliding" over the Earth's surface is the horizontal component of the Coriolis term
$$-2 \, \boldsymbol{\omega} \times \mathbf{v}$$
This component is orthogonal to the velocity over the Earth surface and is given by the expression
$$\omega \, v\  2 \, \sin \phi$$
where

- $\omega$ is the spin rate of the Earth
- $\phi$ is the latitude, positive in the Northern Hemisphere and negative in the Southern Hemisphere

In the Northern Hemisphere, where the latitude is positive, this acceleration, as viewed from above, is to the right of the direction of motion. Conversely, it is to the left in the southern hemisphere.

=== Rotating sphere ===
Coordinate system at latitude φ with x-axis east, y-axis north, and z-axis upward (i.e. radially outward from center of sphere)

Consider a location with latitude φ on a sphere that is rotating around the north–south axis. A local coordinate system is set up with the x axis horizontally due east, the y axis horizontally due north and the z axis vertically upwards. The rotation vector, velocity of movement and Coriolis acceleration expressed in this local coordinate system [listing components in the order east (e), north (n) and upward (u)] are:
$$\boldsymbol{ \Omega} = \omega \begin{pmatrix} 0 \\ \cos \varphi \\ \sin \varphi \end{pmatrix}\ , \mathbf{ v} = \begin{pmatrix} v_{\mathrm e} \\ v_{\mathrm n} \\ v_{\mathrm u} \end{pmatrix}\ ,$$
$$\mathbf{a}_{\mathrm C } =-2\boldsymbol{\Omega} \times\mathbf{v}= 2\,\omega\, \begin{pmatrix} v_{\mathrm n} \sin \varphi-v_{\mathrm u} \cos \varphi \\ -v_{\mathrm e} \sin \varphi \\ v_{\mathrm e} \cos\varphi\end{pmatrix}\ .$$
When considering atmospheric or oceanic dynamics, the vertical velocity is small, and the vertical component of the Coriolis acceleration ($v_e \cos\varphi$) is small compared with the acceleration due to gravity (g, approximately 9.81 m/s^{2} (32.2 ft/s^{2}) near Earth's surface). For such cases, only the horizontal (east and north) components matter. The restriction of the above to the horizontal plane is (setting v_{u} = 0):
$$\mathbf{ v} = \begin{pmatrix} v_{\mathrm e} \\ v_{\mathrm n}\end{pmatrix}\ , \mathbf{ a}_{\mathrm C} = \begin{pmatrix} v_{\mathrm n} \\ -v_{\mathrm e}\end{pmatrix}\ f\ ,$$
where $f = 2 \omega \sin \varphi \,$ is called the Coriolis parameter.

By setting v_{n} = 0, it can be seen immediately that (for positive φ and ω) a movement due east results in an acceleration due south; similarly, setting v_{e} = 0, it is seen that a movement due north results in an acceleration due east. In general, observed horizontally, looking along the direction of the movement causing the acceleration, the acceleration always is turned 90° to the right (for positive φ) and of the same size regardless of the horizontal orientation.

In the case of equatorial motion, setting φ = 0° yields:
$$\boldsymbol{ \Omega} = \omega \begin{pmatrix} 0 \\ 1 \\ 0 \end{pmatrix}\ ,
\mathbf{ v} = \begin{pmatrix} v_{\mathrm e} \\ v_{\mathrm n} \\ v_{\mathrm u} \end{pmatrix}\ ,$$
$$\mathbf{ a}_{\mathrm C}  = -2\boldsymbol{\Omega} \times\mathbf{v} = 2\,\omega\, \begin{pmatrix} -v_{\mathrm u } \\0 \\ v_{\mathrm e} \end{pmatrix}\ .$$
Ω in this case is parallel to the north–south axis.

Accordingly, an eastward motion (that is, in the same direction as the rotation of the sphere) provides an upward acceleration known as the Eötvös effect, and an upward motion produces an acceleration due west.

=== Meteorology and oceanography ===
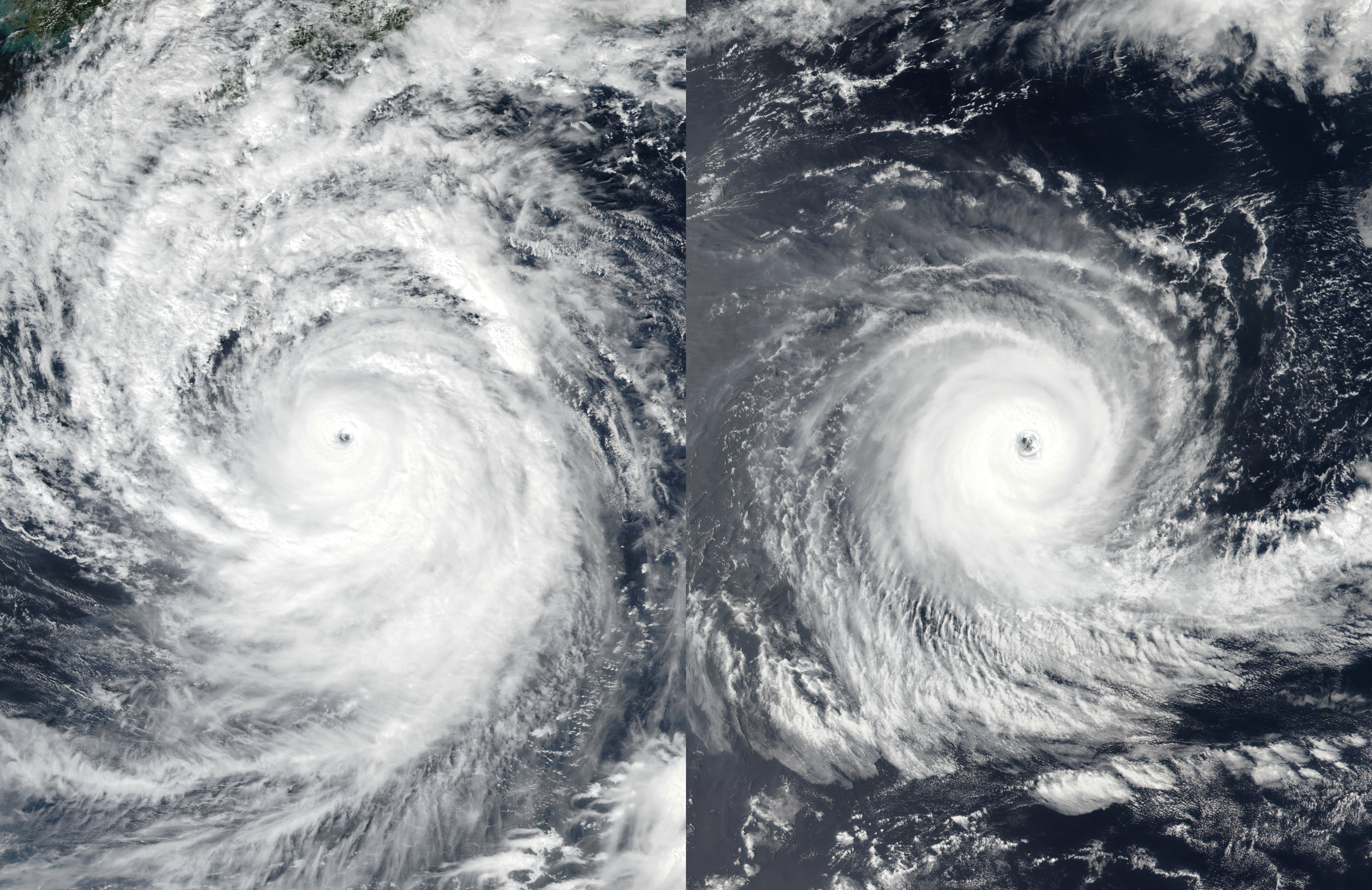
Due to the Coriolis force, low-pressure systems in the Northern Hemisphere, like Typhoon Nanmadol (left), rotate counterclockwise, and in the Southern Hemisphere, low-pressure systems like Cyclone Darian (right) rotate clockwise.

Schematic representation of flow around a low-pressure area in the Northern Hemisphere. The Rossby number is low, so the centrifugal force is virtually negligible. The pressure-gradient force is represented by blue arrows, the Coriolis acceleration (always perpendicular to the velocity) by red arrows

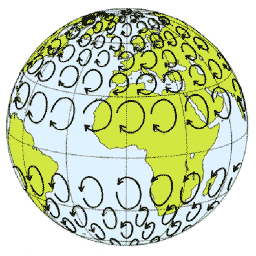
Schematic representation of inertial circles of air masses in the absence of other forces, calculated for a wind speed of approximately 50 to 70 m/s (110 to 160 mph).

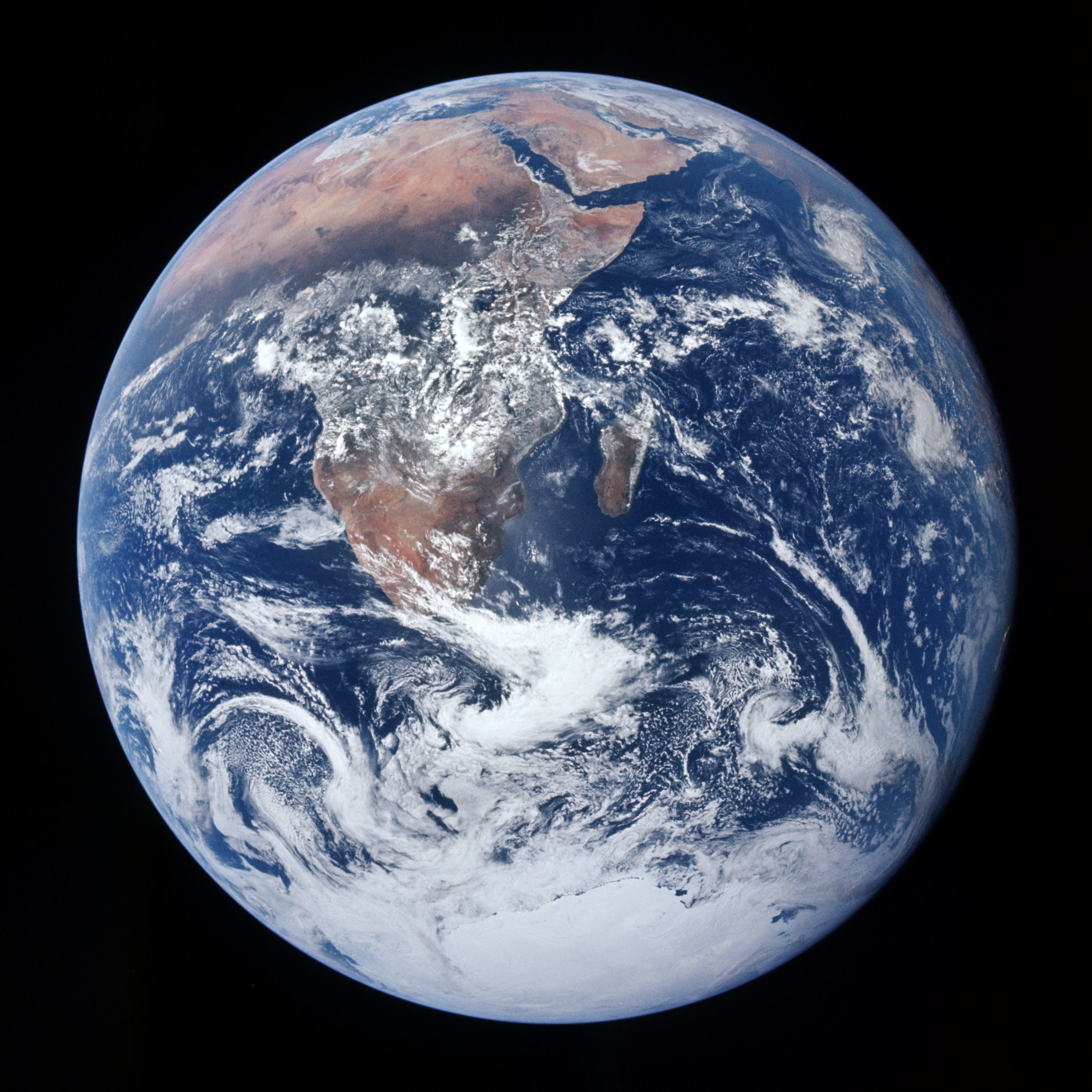
Cloud formations in a famous image of Earth from Apollo 17, makes similar circulation directly visible

Perhaps the most important impact of the Coriolis effect is in the large-scale dynamics of the oceans and the atmosphere. In meteorology and oceanography, it is convenient to postulate a rotating frame of reference wherein the Earth is stationary. In accommodation of that provisional postulation, the centrifugal and Coriolis forces are introduced. Their relative importance is determined by the applicable Rossby numbers. Tornadoes have high Rossby numbers, so, while tornado-associated centrifugal forces are quite substantial, Coriolis forces associated with tornadoes are for practical purposes negligible.

Because surface ocean currents are driven by the movement of wind over the water's surface, the Coriolis force also affects the movement of ocean currents and cyclones as well. Many of the ocean's largest currents circulate around warm, high-pressure areas called gyres. Though the circulation is not as significant as that in the air, the deflection caused by the Coriolis effect is what creates the spiralling pattern in these gyres. The spiralling wind pattern helps the hurricane form. The stronger the force from the Coriolis effect, the faster the wind spins and picks up additional energy, increasing the strength of the hurricane.

Air within high-pressure systems rotates in a direction such that the Coriolis force is directed radially inwards, and nearly balanced by the outwardly radial pressure gradient. As a result, air travels clockwise around high pressure in the Northern Hemisphere and anticlockwise in the Southern Hemisphere. Air around low-pressure rotates in the opposite direction, so that the Coriolis force is directed radially outward and nearly balances an inwardly radial pressure gradient.

==== Flow around a low-pressure area ====
If a low-pressure area forms in the atmosphere, air tends to flow in towards it, but is deflected perpendicular to its velocity by the Coriolis force. A system of equilibrium can then establish itself creating circular movement, or a cyclonic flow. Because the Rossby number is low, the force balance is largely between the pressure-gradient force acting towards the low-pressure area and the Coriolis force acting away from the center of the low pressure.

Instead of flowing down the gradient, large scale motions in the atmosphere and ocean tend to occur perpendicular to the pressure gradient. This is known as geostrophic flow. On a non-rotating planet, fluid would flow along the straightest possible line, quickly eliminating pressure gradients. The geostrophic balance is thus very different from the case of "inertial motions" (see below), which explains why mid-latitude cyclones are larger by an order of magnitude than inertial circle flow would be.

This pattern of deflection, and the direction of movement, is called Buys-Ballot's law. In the atmosphere, the pattern of flow is called a cyclone. In the Northern Hemisphere the direction of movement around a low-pressure area is anticlockwise. In the Southern Hemisphere, the direction of movement is clockwise because the rotational dynamics is a mirror image there. At high altitudes, outward-spreading air rotates in the opposite direction. Cyclones rarely form along the equator due to the weak Coriolis effect present in this region.

==== Inertial circles ====
An air or water mass moving with speed $v\,$ subject only to the Coriolis force travels in a circular trajectory called an inertial circle. Since the force is directed at right angles to the motion of the particle, it moves with a constant speed around a circle whose radius $R$ is given by:
$$R = \frac{v}{f}$$
where $f$ is the Coriolis parameter $2 \Omega \sin \varphi$, introduced above (where $\varphi$ is the latitude). The time taken for the mass to complete a full circle is therefore $2\pi/f$. The Coriolis parameter typically has a mid-latitude value of about 10^{−4} s^{−1}; hence for a typical atmospheric speed of 10 m/s (22 mph), the radius is 100 km (62 mi) with a period of about 17 hours. For an ocean current with a typical speed of 10 cm/s (0.22 mph), the radius of an inertial circle is 1 km (0.6 mi). These inertial circles are clockwise in the Northern Hemisphere (where trajectories are bent to the right) and anticlockwise in the Southern Hemisphere.

If the rotating system is a parabolic turntable, then $f$ is constant and the trajectories are exact circles. On a rotating planet, $f$ varies with latitude and the paths of particles do not form exact circles. Since the parameter $f$ varies as the sine of the latitude, the radius of the oscillations associated with a given speed are smallest at the poles (latitude of ±90°), and increase toward the equator.

==== Other terrestrial effects ====
The Coriolis effect strongly affects the large-scale oceanic and atmospheric circulation, leading to the formation of robust features like jet streams and western boundary currents. Such features are in geostrophic balance, meaning that the Coriolis and pressure gradient forces balance each other. Coriolis acceleration is also responsible for the propagation of many types of waves in the ocean and atmosphere, including Rossby waves and Kelvin waves. It is also instrumental in the so-called Ekman dynamics in the ocean, and in the establishment of the large-scale ocean flow pattern called the Sverdrup balance.

=== Eötvös effect ===
The practical impact of the "Coriolis effect" is mostly caused by the horizontal acceleration component produced by horizontal motion.

There are other components of the Coriolis effect. Westward-traveling objects are deflected downwards, while eastward-traveling objects are deflected upwards. This is known as the Eötvös effect. This aspect of the Coriolis effect is greatest near the equator. The force produced by the Eötvös effect is similar to the horizontal component, but the much larger vertical forces due to gravity and pressure suggest that it is unimportant in the hydrostatic equilibrium. However, in the atmosphere, winds are associated with small deviations of pressure from the hydrostatic equilibrium. In the tropical atmosphere, the order of magnitude of the pressure deviations is so small that the contribution of the Eötvös effect to the pressure deviations is considerable.

In addition, objects traveling upwards (i.e. out) or downwards (i.e. in) are deflected to the west or east respectively. This effect is also the greatest near the equator. Since vertical movement is usually of limited extent and duration, the size of the effect is smaller and requires precise instruments to detect. For example, idealized numerical modeling studies suggest that this effect can directly affect tropical large-scale wind field by roughly 10% given long-duration (2 weeks or more) heating or cooling in the atmosphere. Moreover, in the case of large changes of momentum, such as a spacecraft being launched into orbit, the effect becomes significant. The fastest and most fuel-efficient path to orbit is a launch from the equator that curves to a directly eastward heading.

==== Intuitive example ====
Imagine a train that travels through a frictionless railway line along the equator. Assume that, when in motion, it moves at the necessary speed to complete a trip around the world in one day (465 m/s). The Coriolis effect can be considered in three cases: when the train travels west, when it is at rest, and when it travels east. In each case, the Coriolis effect can be calculated from the rotating frame of reference on Earth first, and then checked against a fixed inertial frame. The image below illustrates the three cases as viewed by an observer at rest in a (near) inertial frame from a fixed point above the North Pole along the Earth's axis of rotation; the train is denoted by a few red pixels, fixed at the left side in the leftmost picture, moving in the others $\left(1\text{ day} \mathrel\overset{\land}{=} 8\text{ s}\right):$

Earth and train

1. The train travels toward the west: In that case, it moves against the direction of rotation. Therefore, on the Earth's rotating frame the Coriolis term is pointed inwards towards the axis of rotation (down). This additional force downwards should cause the train to be heavier while moving in that direction.
  If one looks at this train from the fixed non-rotating frame on top of the center of the Earth, at that speed it remains stationary as the Earth spins beneath it. Hence, the only force acting on it is gravity and the reaction from the track. This force is greater (by 0.34%) than the force that the passengers and the train experience when at rest (rotating along with Earth). This difference is what the Coriolis effect accounts for in the rotating frame of reference.
2. The train comes to a stop: From the point of view on the Earth's rotating frame, the velocity of the train is zero, thus the Coriolis force is also zero and the train and its passengers recuperate their usual weight.
  From the fixed inertial frame of reference above Earth, the train now rotates along with the rest of the Earth. 0.34% of the force of gravity provides the centripetal force needed to achieve the circular motion on that frame of reference. The remaining force, as measured by a scale, makes the train and passengers "lighter" than in the previous case.
3. The train travels east. In this case, because it moves in the direction of Earth's rotating frame, the Coriolis term is directed outward from the axis of rotation (up). This upward force makes the train seem lighter still than when at rest.
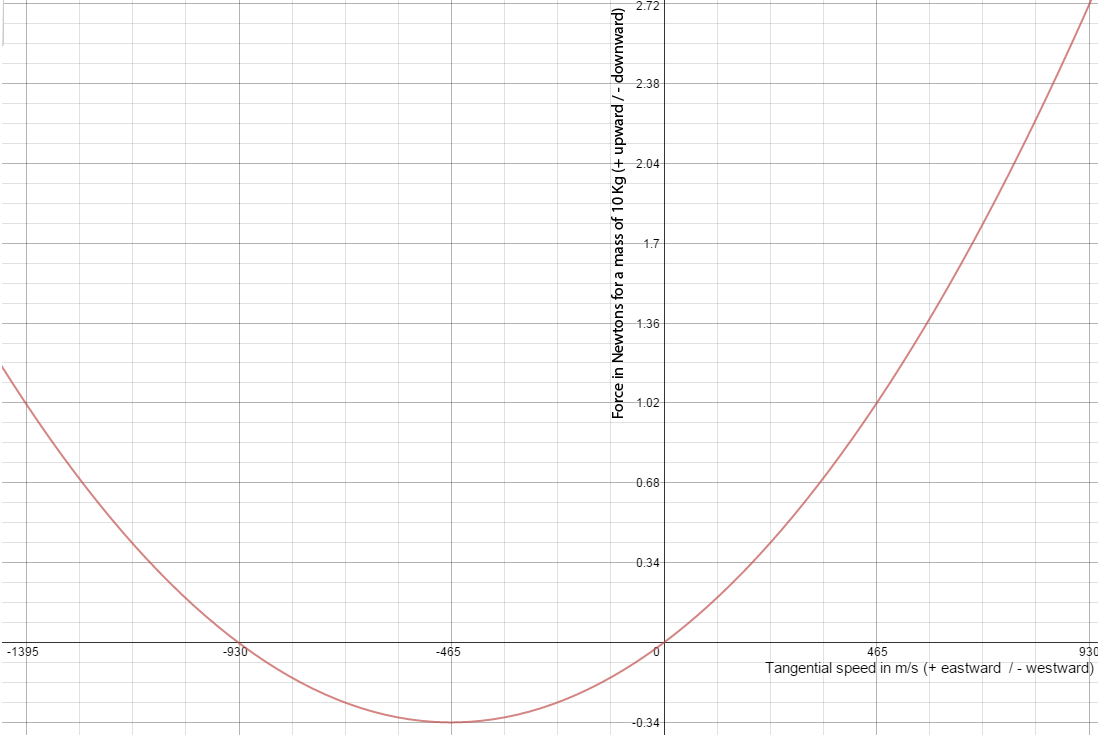
  Graph of the force experienced by a 10-kilogram (22 lb) object as a function of its speed moving along Earth's equator (as measured within the rotating frame). (Positive force in the graph is directed upward. Positive speed is directed eastward and negative speed is directed westward).
  From the fixed inertial frame of reference above Earth, the train traveling east now rotates at twice the rate as when it was at rest—so the amount of centripetal force needed to cause that circular path increases leaving less force from gravity to act on the track. This is what the Coriolis term accounts for on the previous paragraph.
  As a final check one can imagine a frame of reference rotating along with the train. Such frame would be rotating at twice the angular velocity as Earth's rotating frame. The resulting centrifugal force component for that imaginary frame would be greater. Since the train and its passengers are at rest, that would be the only component in that frame explaining again why the train and the passengers are lighter than in the previous two cases.

This also explains why high-speed projectiles that travel west are deflected down, and those that travel east are deflected up. This vertical component of the Coriolis effect is called the Eötvös effect.

The above example can be used to explain why the Eötvös effect starts diminishing when an object is traveling westward as its tangential speed increases above Earth's rotation (465 m/s). If the westward train in the above example increases speed, part of the force of gravity that pushes against the track accounts for the centripetal force needed to keep it in circular motion on the inertial frame. Once the train doubles its westward speed at 930 m/s (2,100 mph) that centripetal force becomes equal to the force the train experiences when it stops. From the inertial frame, in both cases it rotates at the same speed but in the opposite directions. Thus, the force is the same cancelling completely the Eötvös effect. Any object that moves westward at a speed above 930 m/s (2,100 mph) experiences an upward force instead. In the figure, the Eötvös effect is illustrated for a 10-kilogram (22 lb) object on the train at different speeds. The parabolic shape is because the centripetal force is proportional to the square of the tangential speed. On the inertial frame, the bottom of the parabola is centered at the origin. The offset is because this argument uses the Earth's rotating frame of reference. The graph shows that the Eötvös effect is not symmetrical, and that the resulting downward force experienced by an object that travels west at high velocity is less than the resulting upward force when it travels east at the same speed.

=== Draining in bathtubs and toilets ===
Contrary to popular misconception, bathtubs, toilets, and other water receptacles do not drain in opposite directions in the Northern and Southern Hemispheres. This is because the magnitude of the Coriolis force is negligible at this scale. Forces determined by the initial conditions of the water (e.g. the geometry of the drain, the geometry of the receptacle, preexisting momentum of the water, etc.) are likely to be orders of magnitude greater than the Coriolis force and hence will determine the direction of water rotation, if any. For example, identical toilets flushed in both hemispheres drain in the same direction, and this direction is determined mostly by the shape of the toilet bowl.

Under real-world conditions, the Coriolis force does not influence the direction of water flow perceptibly. Only if the water is so still that the effective rotation rate of the Earth is faster than that of the water relative to its container, and if externally applied torques (such as might be caused by flow over an uneven bottom surface) are small enough, the Coriolis effect may indeed determine the direction of the vortex. Without such careful preparation, the Coriolis effect will be much smaller than various other influences on drain direction such as any residual rotation of the water and the geometry of the container.

==== Laboratory testing of draining water under atypical conditions ====
In 1962, Ascher Shapiro performed an experiment at MIT to test the Coriolis force on a large basin of water, 2 meters (6 ft 7 in) across, with a small wooden cross above the plug hole to display the direction of rotation, covering it and waiting for at least 24 hours for the water to settle. Under these precise laboratory conditions, he demonstrated the effect and consistent counterclockwise rotation. The experiment required extreme precision, since the acceleration due to Coriolis effect is only $3\times 10^{-7}$ that of gravity. The vortex was measured by a cross made of two slivers of wood pinned above the draining hole. It takes 20 minutes to drain, and the cross starts turning only around 15 minutes. At the end it is turning at 1 rotation every 3 to 4 seconds.

He reported that,

Both schools of thought are in some sense correct. For the everyday observations of the kitchen sink and bath-tub variety, the direction of the vortex seems to vary in an unpredictable manner with the date, the time of day, and the particular household of the experimenter. But under well-controlled conditions of experimentation, the observer looking downward at a drain in the northern hemisphere will always see a counter-clockwise vortex, while one in the southern hemisphere will always see a clockwise vortex. In a properly designed experiment, the vortex is produced by Coriolis forces, which are counter-clockwise in the northern hemisphere.

Lloyd M. Trefethen reported clockwise rotation in the Southern Hemisphere at the University of Sydney in five tests with settling times of 18 h or more.

=== Ballistic trajectories ===
The Coriolis force is important in external ballistics for calculating the trajectories of very long-range artillery shells. The most famous historical example was the Paris gun, used by the Germans during World War I to bombard Paris from a range of about 120 km (75 mi). The Coriolis force minutely changes the trajectory of a bullet, affecting accuracy at extremely long distances. It is adjusted for by accurate long-distance shooters, such as snipers. At the latitude of Sacramento, California, a 1,000 yd (910 m) northward shot would be deflected 2.8 in (71 mm) to the right. There is also a vertical component, explained in the Eötvös effect section above, which causes westward shots to hit low, and eastward shots to hit high.

The effects of the Coriolis force on ballistic trajectories should not be confused with the curvature of the paths of missiles, satellites, and similar objects when the paths are plotted on two-dimensional (flat) maps, such as the Mercator projection. The projections of the three-dimensional curved surface of the Earth to a two-dimensional surface (the map) necessarily results in distorted features. The apparent curvature of the path is a consequence of the sphericity of the Earth and would occur even in a non-rotating frame.

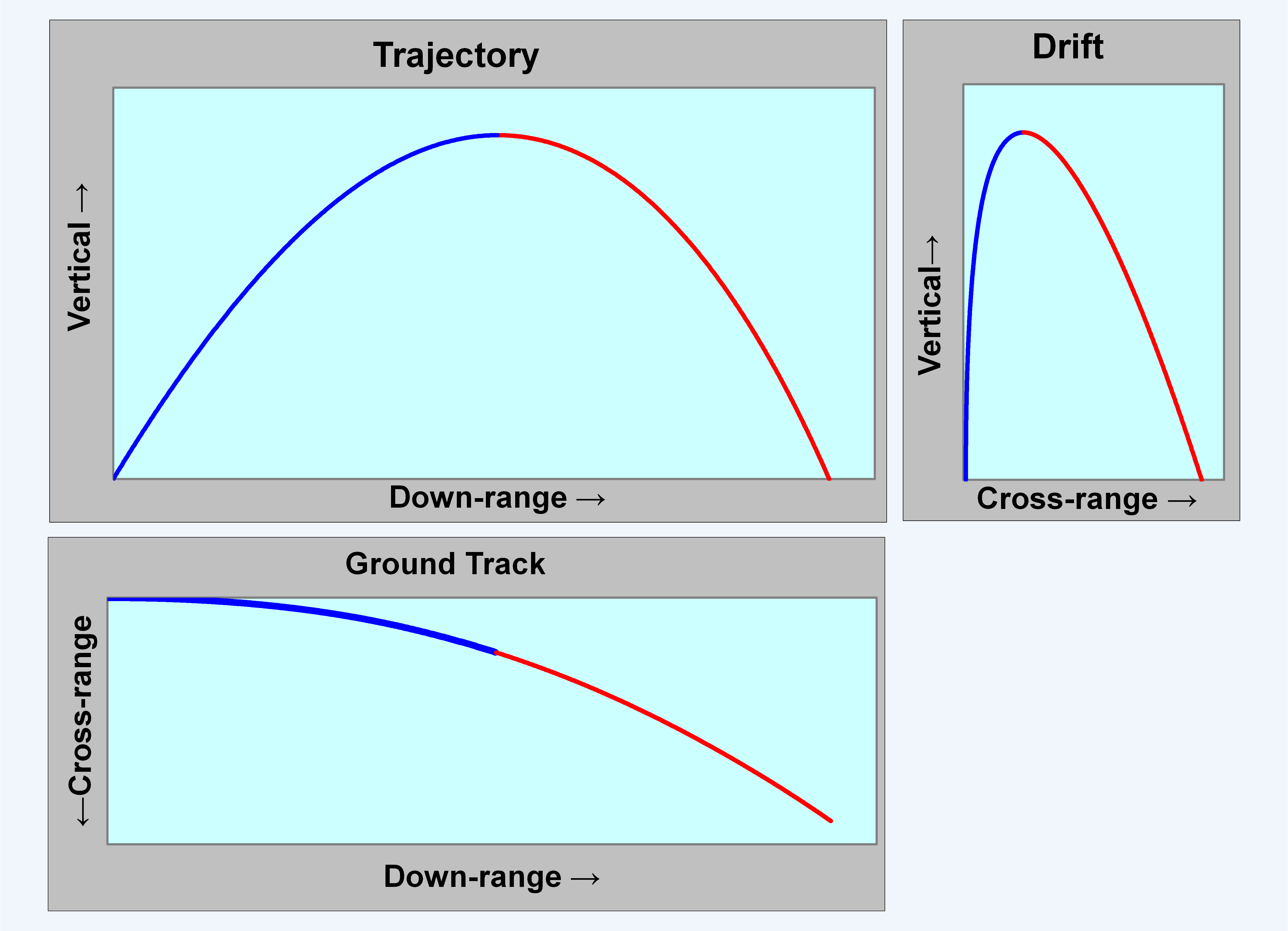
Trajectory, ground track, and drift of a typical projectile. The axes are not to scale.

The Coriolis force on a moving projectile depends on velocity components in all three directions, latitude, and azimuth. The directions are typically downrange (the direction that the gun is initially pointing), vertical, and cross-range.

$$A_\mathrm{X} = -2 \omega ( V_\mathrm{Y} \cos \theta_\mathrm{lat} \sin \phi_\mathrm{az} + V_\mathrm{Z}  \sin \theta_\mathrm{lat} )$$
$$A_\mathrm{Y} = 2 \omega ( V_\mathrm{X} \cos \theta_\mathrm{lat} \sin \phi_\mathrm{az} + V_\mathrm{Z}  \cos \theta_\mathrm{lat} \cos \phi_\mathrm{az})$$
$$A_\mathrm{Z} = 2 \omega ( V_\mathrm{X} \sin \theta_\mathrm{lat}  - V_\mathrm{Y}  \cos \theta_\mathrm{lat} \cos \phi_\mathrm{az})$$
where

- $A_\mathrm{X}$, down-range acceleration.
- $A_\mathrm{Y}$, vertical acceleration with positive indicating acceleration upward.
- $A_\mathrm{Z}$, cross-range acceleration with positive indicating acceleration to the right.
- $V_\mathrm{X}$, down-range velocity.
- $V_\mathrm{Y}$, vertical velocity with positive indicating upward.
- $V_\mathrm{Z}$, cross-range velocity with positive indicating velocity to the right.
- $\omega$ = 0.00007292 rad/sec, angular velocity of the Earth (based on a sidereal day).
- $\theta_\mathrm{lat}$, latitude with positive indicating Northern Hemisphere.
- $\phi_\mathrm{az}$, azimuth measured clockwise from due North.

== Visualization ==
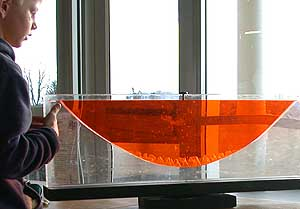
Fluid assuming a parabolic shape as it is rotating

Object moving frictionlessly over the surface of a very shallow parabolic dish. The object has been released in such a way that it follows an elliptical trajectory. Left: The inertial point of view. Right: The co-rotating point of view.

The forces at play in the case of a curved surface. Red: gravity Green: the normal force Blue: the net resultant centripetal force.

To demonstrate the Coriolis effect, a parabolic turntable can be used. On a flat turntable, the inertia of a co-rotating object forces it off the edge. However, if the turntable surface has the correct paraboloid (parabolic bowl) shape (see the figure) and rotates at the corresponding rate, the force components shown in the figure make the component of gravity tangential to the bowl surface exactly equal to the centripetal force necessary to keep the object rotating at its velocity and radius of curvature (assuming no friction, see banked turn). This carefully contoured surface allows the Coriolis force to be displayed in isolation.

Discs cut from cylinders of dry ice can be used as pucks, moving around almost frictionlessly over the surface of the parabolic turntable, allowing effects of Coriolis on dynamic phenomena to show themselves. To get a view of the motions as seen from the reference frame rotating with the turntable, a video camera is attached to the turntable so as to co-rotate with the turntable, with results as shown in the figure. In the left panel of the figure, which is the viewpoint of a stationary observer, the gravitational force in the inertial frame pulling the object toward the center (bottom) of the dish is proportional to the distance of the object from the center. A centripetal force of this form causes the elliptical motion. In the right panel, which shows the viewpoint of the rotating frame, the inward gravitational force in the rotating frame (the same force as in the inertial frame) is balanced by the outward centrifugal force (present only in the rotating frame). With these two forces balanced, in the rotating frame the only unbalanced force is Coriolis (also present only in the rotating frame), and the motion is an inertial circle. Analysis and observation of circular motion in the rotating frame is a simplification compared with analysis and observation of elliptical motion in the inertial frame.

Because this reference frame rotates several times a minute rather than only once a day like the Earth, the Coriolis acceleration produced is many times larger and so easier to observe on small time and spatial scales than is the Coriolis acceleration caused by the rotation of the Earth.

In a manner of speaking, the Earth is analogous to such a turntable. The rotation has caused the planet to settle on a spheroid shape, such that the normal force, the gravitational force and the centrifugal force exactly balance each other on a "horizontal" surface (see equatorial bulge).

The Coriolis effect caused by the rotation of the Earth can be seen indirectly through the motion of a Foucault pendulum.

== In other areas ==
=== Coriolis flow meter ===
A practical application of the Coriolis effect is the mass flow meter, an instrument that measures the mass flow rate and density of a fluid flowing through a tube. The operating principle involves inducing a vibration of the tube through which the fluid passes. The vibration, though not completely circular, provides the rotating reference frame that gives rise to the Coriolis effect. While specific methods vary according to the design of the flow meter, sensors monitor and analyze changes in frequency, phase shift, and amplitude of the vibrating flow tubes. The changes observed represent the mass flow rate and density of the fluid.

=== Molecular physics ===
In polyatomic molecules, the molecule motion can be described by a rigid body rotation and internal vibration of atoms about their equilibrium position. As a result of the vibrations of the atoms, the atoms are in motion relative to the rotating coordinate system of the molecule. Coriolis effects are therefore present, and make the atoms move in a direction perpendicular to the original oscillations. This leads to a mixing in molecular spectra between the rotational and vibrational levels, from which Coriolis coupling constants can be determined.

=== Insect flight ===
Flies (Diptera) and some moths (Lepidoptera) exploit the Coriolis effect in flight with specialized appendages and organs that relay information about the angular velocity of their bodies. Coriolis forces resulting from linear motion of these appendages are detected within the rotating frame of reference of the insects' bodies. In the case of flies, their specialized appendages are dumbbell shaped organs located just behind their wings called "halteres".

The fly's halteres oscillate in a plane at the same beat frequency as the main wings so that any body rotation results in lateral deviation of the halteres from their plane of motion.

In moths, their antennae are known to be responsible for the sensing of Coriolis forces in the similar manner as with the halteres in flies. In both flies and moths, a collection of mechanosensors at the base of the appendage are sensitive to deviations at the beat frequency, correlating to rotation in the pitch and roll planes, and at twice the beat frequency, correlating to rotation in the yaw plane.

=== Lagrangian point stability ===
In astronomy, Lagrangian points are five positions in the orbital plane of two large orbiting bodies where a small object affected only by gravity can maintain a stable position relative to the two large bodies. The first three Lagrangian points (L_{1}, L_{2}, L_{3}) lie along the line connecting the two large bodies, while the last two points (L_{4} and L_{5}) each form an equilateral triangle with the two large bodies. The L_{4} and L_{5} points, although they correspond to maxima of the effective potential in the coordinate frame that rotates with the two large bodies, are stable due to the Coriolis effect. The stability can result in orbits around just L_{4} or L_{5}, known as tadpole orbits, where trojans can be found. It can also result in orbits that encircle L_{3}, L_{4}, and L_{5}, known as horseshoe orbits.

== See also ==
- Analytical mechanics
- Applied mechanics
- Classical mechanics
- Earth's rotation
- Equatorial Rossby wave
- Frenet–Serret formulas
- Gyroscope
- Kinetics (physics)
- Reactive centrifugal force
- Secondary flow
- Statics
- Uniform circular motion
- Whirlpool
