= Balthasar van der Pol =

Dutch physicist (1889–1959)

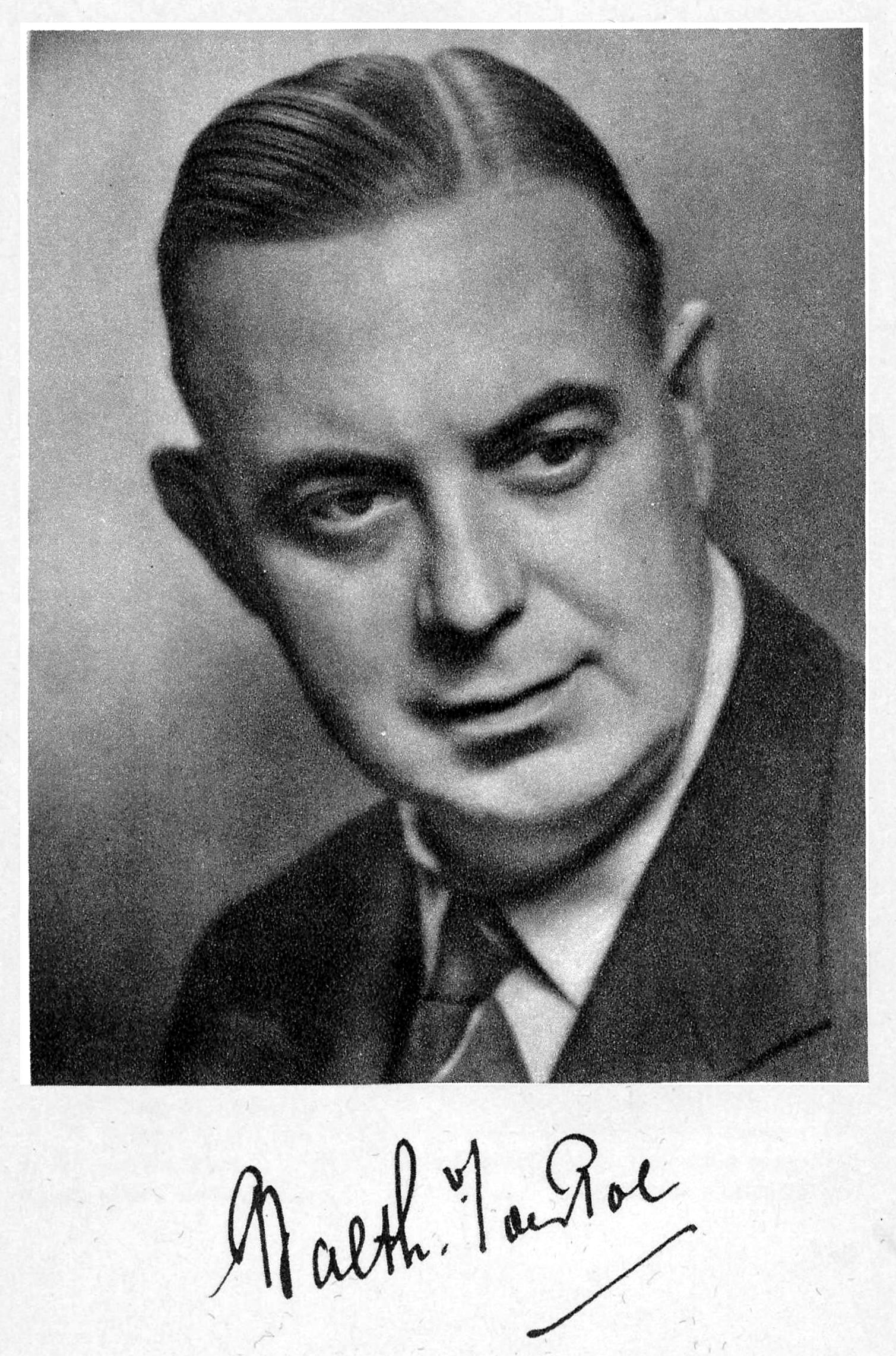
- Van der Pol in 1939
- Born: 27 January 1889; Utrecht, Netherlands
- Died: 6 October 1959 (aged 70); Wassenaar, Netherlands
- Education: Utrecht University (BSc, DSc)
- Known for: Van der Pol oscillator
- Spouse: Pietronetta Posthuma (m. 1917)
- Children: 3
- Awards: IRE Medal of Honor (1935); Valdemar Poulsen Gold Medal (1953)
- Scientific career
- Fields: Physics
- Workplaces: Teylers Museum; Philips; Delft University of Technology
- Thesis: De invloed van een geioniseerd gas op het voortschrijden van electromagnetische golven en toepassingen daarvan op het gebied der draadlooze telegraphie en bij metingen aan glimlichtontladingen (1920)
- Doctoral advisor: Willem Henri Julius

Balthasar van der Pol (27 January 1889 – 6 October 1959) was a Dutch physicist known for the van der Pol oscillator.

== Biography ==
Balthasar van der Pol was born on 27 January 1889 in Utrecht, Netherlands, the son of Gerhardina Clasina (née Steffens) and Balthazar van der Pol, a rich tea merchant. In 1911, he entered Utrecht University, where he studied physics and mathematics, and graduated with a degree (cum laude) in Physics in 1916.

After graduation, Van der Pol continued his studies in England, where he spent one year with Ambrose Fleming at University College London, followed by another two years with J. J. Thomson at the University of Cambridge. While in England, he studied the heuristics of wireless reception onboard ships.

On 2 June 1917 in London, Van der Pol married Pietronetta Posthuma, with whom he had a son and two daughters.

In 1919, Van der Pol returned to the Netherlands and became an assistant to Hendrik Lorentz at Teylers Museum in Haarlem. The following year, he received a Doctor of Science (cum laude) from Utrecht University, with Willem Henri Julius as his thesis advisor.

In 1922, Van der Pol became Head Physicist of the Philips Physical Laboratory in Eindhoven, where he worked until his retirement in 1949. He was also Professor of Theoretical Electricity at the Delft University of Technology from 1938 to 1949.

Van der Pol died at his home in Wassenaar on 6 October 1959 at the age of 70.

== Research ==
As observed by Hendrik Casimir, "Radio might have remained a field of haphazard empiricism along with wild commercial ventures, but for the influence of men like Van der Pol who stressed the need for a more scientific approach."

“[Van der Pol] tried to find differential equations which illustrated general problems but which were simple enough to investigate mathematically. When mathematics would carry him no further, he set up circuits satisfying the differential equations and investigated the system empirically."

The differential equations of coupled electrical systems drew his interest, and he developed the idea of "relaxation oscillations". With J. van der Mark he applied the idea to the heartbeat, which provided one of the earliest quantitative models of the action potential. These studies led him to the van der Pol equation and Oliver Heaviside's method of dealing with differential equations called operational calculus. He submitted articles to Philosophical Magazine on the operational calculus and, in coordination with H. Bremmer, wrote Modern Operational Calculus based on the Two-sided Laplace Integral, published by Cambridge University Press.

== Recognition ==
=== Honors ===
| Year | Country | Honor | Ref. |
|---|---|---|---|
| 1927 | Netherlands | Knight of the Order of Orange-Nassau | |

=== Awards ===
| Year | Organization | Award | Citation | Ref. |
|---|---|---|---|---|
| 1935 | Institute of Radio Engineers | IRE Medal of Honor | "For his fundamental studies and contributions in the field of circuit theory and electromagnetic wave propagation phenomena." | |
| 1953 | Danish Academy of Technical Sciences | Valdemar Poulsen Gold Medal | "For outstanding contributions to radiotechnics and particularly for research in the field of electromagnetic oscillations and wave propagation and for international scientific cooperation and organization of technical questions related to radio communication." | |

=== Memberships ===
| Year | Organization | Type | Ref. |
|---|---|---|---|
| 1949 | Royal Netherlands Academy of Arts and Sciences | Member | |

== Works ==
- 1928: (with J van der Mark) The Heartbeat considered as a Relaxation oscillation, and an Electrical Model of the Heart. Phil. Mag. Suppl. No. 6 pp 763–775
- 1947: An electro-mechanical investigation of the Riemann zeta function in the critical strip, Bulletin of the American Mathematical Society 53: 976–81 MR 0022712
- 1964: (with H. Bremmer) Operational Calculus Cambridge University Press
- 1960: Selected Scientific Papers, North-Holland Two volumes
