= Selden Jennings Coffin =

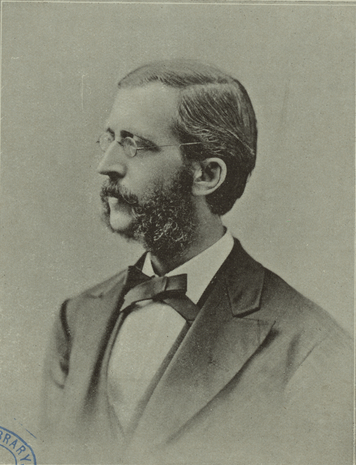
- Born: August 3, 1838; Ogdensburg, New York
- Died: March 15, 1915 (aged 76); Easton, Pennsylvania
- Occupation: Professor

Selden Jennings Coffin (August 3, 1838 – March 15, 1915) was an American professor of mathematics and astronomy.

== Biography ==
Coffin was born in Ogdensburg, New York to Aurelia and James Henry Coffin. He was a direct descendant of Tristram Coffin, the first owner of Nantucket Island. Coffin attended Lafayette College in Easton, Pennsylvania and upon graduating in 1858, attended Princeton University where he graduated in 1864 earning a Ph.D. During his time at Princeton, Coffin was also a professor of mathematics and astronomy at Lafayette.

Starting in 1864, Coffin served as secretary of the alumni association of Lafayette College. Interested in documenting the lives of other Lafayette alumni, he published the Record of the Men of Lafayette in 1879, a directory outlining the lives of the 2,399 graduates up until that year. He also helped publish a work his father had started titled The Winds of the Globe. This work was commissioned by the American Association for the Advancement of Science, of which Selden Coffin was a fellow, and published by the Smithsonian Institution. Following its publication, Coffin was awarded an honorary doctorate by Hanover College. Coffin later helped in the formation of the United States Weather Bureau, later known as the National Weather Service, due to his contributions in The Winds of the Globe.

In 1873, Coffin assumed the chair of mathematics and astronomy which was left vacant by his father upon his death that same year. By 1884, Coffin became Lafayette College's first registrar, and in that capacity published a second record of Lafayette alumni titled, The Men of Lafayette.

Due to complications with his eyesight, in 1904, Coffin tendered his resignation to Lafayette College.

== Personal life ==
Coffin married Mary Angle of Lewisburg, Pennsylvania in 1875 and together they had two sons. After her death in 1889, he married her younger sister, Emma, in 1891.

Coffin died on March 15, 1915, in his home on the Lafayette College campus in Easton.
