= Buys Ballot's law =

Method to determine where barometric highs and lows are based on wind direction

With the wind to one's back (the stick figure is facing out of the picture), a low-pressure center (L) will be to one's left, high pressure (H) to one's right (in the Northern Hemisphere)

In meteorology, Buys Ballot's law (Dutch pronunciation: [ˈbœyz bɑˈlɔt]) may be expressed as follows: In the Northern Hemisphere, if a person stands with their back to the wind, the atmospheric pressure is low to the left, high to the right. This is because wind travels counterclockwise around low pressure zones in the Northern Hemisphere. It is approximately true in the higher latitudes of the Northern Hemisphere, and is reversed in the Southern Hemisphere, but the angle between the pressure gradient force and wind is not a right angle in low latitudes.

A version taught to US Naval Cadets in WW2 is: "In the Northern Hemisphere, if you turn your back to the wind, the low pressure center will be to your left and somewhat toward the front."

== History ==
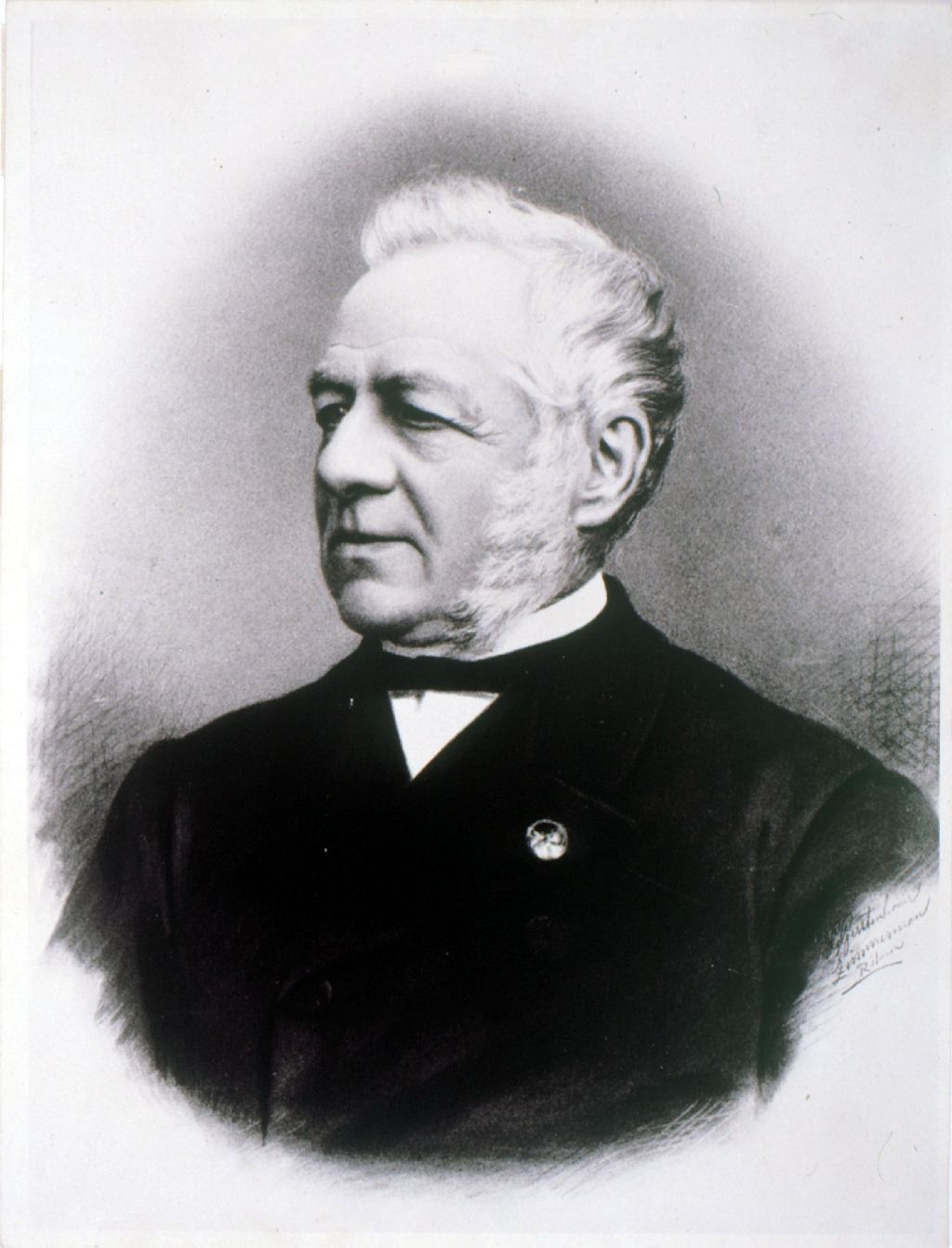
C.H.D. Buys Ballot

As early as the 16th century extensive weather observations were included as part of a ship's log. These observations as well as other log information, were turned over to national hydrographic institutes in various nations, most notably Germany and England and later the US. The information from many ships about individual voyages was compiled ashore and later became what today is still published by England, a 3 volume set complete with charts titled "Sailing Directions for the World". Additionally the US Defense Mapping Agency publishes a 47 volume set Sailing Directions which serves much the same purpose. The information is the distillate of empirical observations of thousands of ships masters over thousands of voyages spanning several hundred years.

Buys Ballot's law, which was first deduced by the American meteorologists J.H. Coffin and William Ferrel, is a direct consequence of Ferrel's law. The law takes its name from C. H. D. Buys Ballot, a Dutch meteorologist, who published it in the Comptes Rendus, 9 November 1857. While William Ferrel theorized this first in 1856, Buys Ballot was the first to provide an empirical validation. While Buys Ballot hoped that his law would be validated by other meteorological services in other countries, foreign dissemination and adoption of Buys Ballot's law was slow. The French and American meteorological services of the era prioritized describing the state of storms rather than forecasting them, finding little use for the predictive value of Buys Ballot's law. However, the British Meteorological Office began to use Buys Ballot's law extensively after reintroducing a storm warning system in 1867 following the death of its former director Robert FitzRoy. The rule of thumb became more widely accepted following its effective use in the British forecasts.

Buys Ballot's law first appeared in early versions (prior to 1900) of Bowditch's American Practical Navigator and other publications written to assist in passage planning and the safe conduct of ships at sea and is still included today both in Bowditch and in Sailing Directions (see following reference) as an item of practical reference and information.

== Uses ==
The law outlines general rules of conduct for masters of both sail and steam vessels, to assist them in steering the vessels away from the center and right front (in the Northern Hemisphere and left front in the Southern Hemisphere) quadrants of hurricanes or any other rotating disturbances at sea. Prior to radio, satellite observation and the ability to transmit timely weather information over long distances, the only method a ship's master had to forecast the weather was observation of meteorological conditions (visible cloud formations, wind direction and atmospheric pressure) at his location.

Included in the Sailing Directions for the World are Buys Ballot's techniques for avoiding the worst part of any rotating storm system at sea using only the locally observable phenomena of cloud formations, wind speed and barometric pressure tendencies over a number of hours. These observations and application of the principles of Buys Ballot's law help to establish the probability of the existence of a storm and the best course to steer to try to avoid the worst of it—with the best chance of survival.

The underlying principles of Buys Ballot's law state that for anyone ashore in the Northern Hemisphere and in the path of a hurricane, the most dangerous place to be is in the right front quadrant of the storm. There, the observed wind speed of the storm is the sum of the speed of wind in the storm circulation plus the velocity of the storm's forward movement. Buys Ballot's law calls this the "Dangerous Quadrant". Likewise, in the left front quadrant of the storm the observed wind is the difference between the storm's wind velocity and its forward speed. This is called the "Safe Quadrant" due to the lower observed wind speeds.

To look at it another way, in the Northern Hemisphere if a person is to the right of where a hurricane or tropical storm makes landfall, that is considered the dangerous quadrant. If they are to the left of the point of landfall, that is the safe quadrant. In the dangerous quadrant an observer will experience higher wind speeds and generally a much higher storm surge due to the onshore wind direction. In the safe quadrant, the observer will experience somewhat lower wind speeds and the possibility of lower than normal water levels due to the direction of the wind being offshore.

These are very general rules that are subject to many other factors, including shapes of the coastline, and topography in any location. Although the principles apply to a very limited extent to a coastal observer during the approach and passage of a storm in any location, Buys Ballot's law was primarily formulated from empirical data to assist ships at sea.
