= Willem Henri Julius =

Dutch astronomer

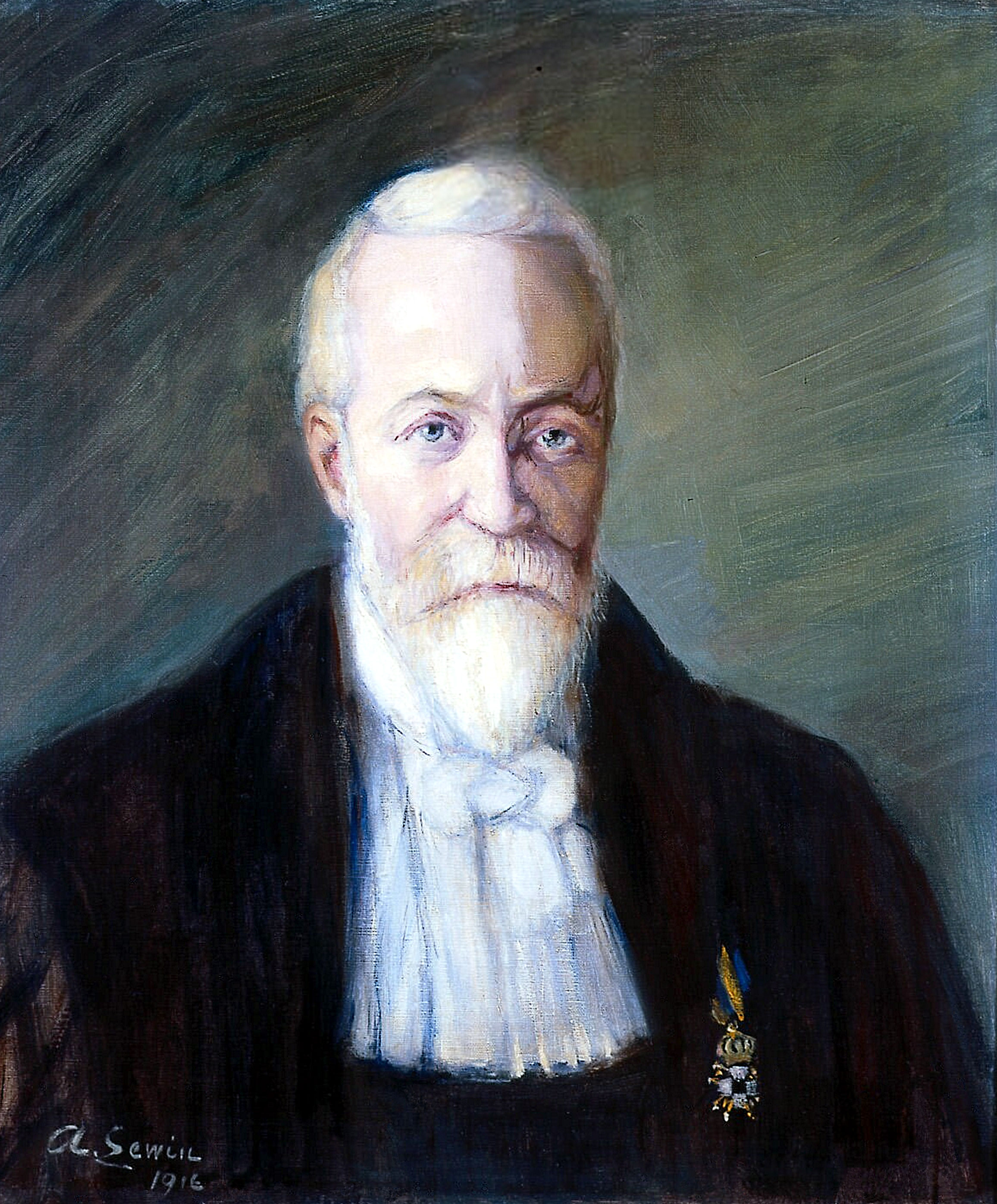
Portrait, 1916, by Antonie Lewin (1858-1938)

Willem Henri Julius (4 August 1860 – 15 April 1925) was a Dutch physicist who specialised in the study of solar radiation and related phenomena. A careful experimenter, he designed several instruments for the measurement of radiation.

Julius was born in Zutphen, and is the son of a namesake school teacher and his wife Maria Margaretha Dumont. After studying at Gouda, he entered the University of Utrecht in 1875. He became an assistant to C. H. D. Buys Ballot in 1882; in 1888, Julius worked with an uncle who was also a physicist. In 1888, he wrote a doctoral dissertation on the spectra from flames and the vibrational frequencies of some gases under Buys Ballot. He taught in Utrecht before joining the University of Amsterdam in 1890. In 1896, he became a professor at Utrecht University. In 1901, he conducted observations during the solar eclipse. From then on, Julius became completely immersed in the study of solar radiation. He examined anomalous scattering and its relation to differences in redshift in the spectra of rays at the prominences and at the centre of the solar disk. He explained the increase in the redshift from the centre to the edge as being due to dispersion by the solar atmosphere, rather than Albert Einstein, who interpreted it as being due to gravitational effects.
