= C. H. D. Buys Ballot =

Dutch chemist and meteorologist (1817–1890)

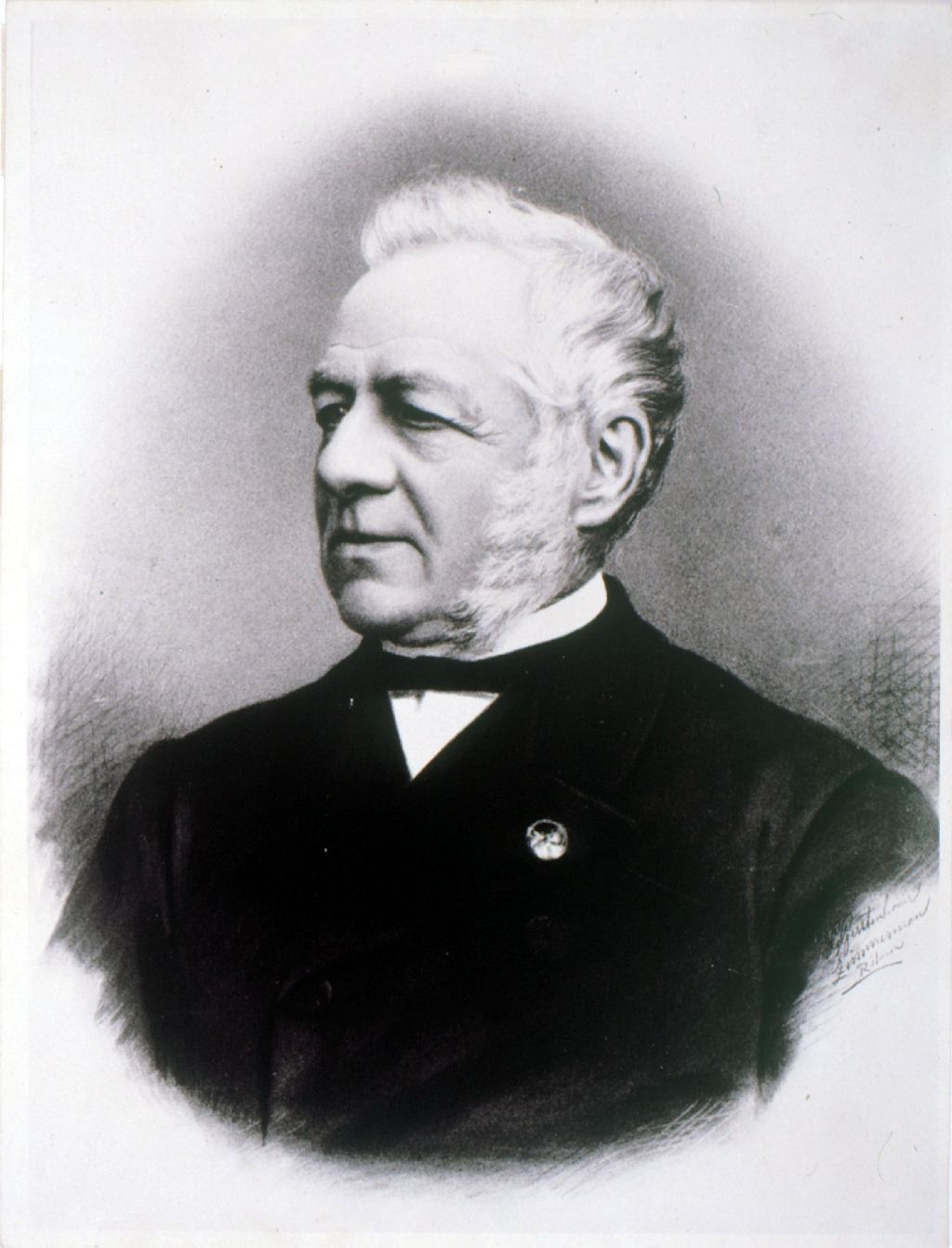
- Born: Christophorus Henricus Diedericus Buys Ballot; 10 October 1817; Kloetinge, Netherlands
- Died: 3 February 1890 (aged 72); Utrecht, Netherlands
- Education: Utrecht University
- Known for: Buys-Ballot's law
- Scientific career
- Fields: chemistry meteorology
- Doctoral students: Willem Henri Julius

Christophorus Henricus Diedericus Buys Ballot (Dutch pronunciation: [ˈbœyz bɑˈlɔt]; 10 October 1817 – 3 February 1890) was a Dutch chemist and meteorologist who is the namesake of Buys Ballot's law. He was the first president of the International Meteorological Organization, the organization that would become the World Meteorological Organization.

== Early and personal life ==
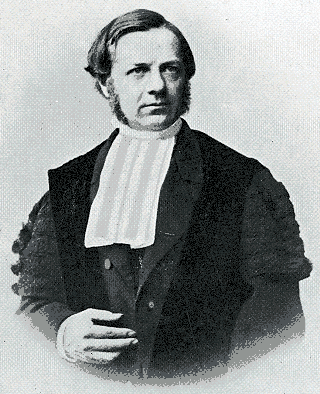
Ballot in 1857

Ballot was born on 10 October 1817, in Kloetinge, to a Dutch Reformed minister. He attended the Gymnasium at Zaltbommel and the University of Utrecht. After receiving his doctorate in 1844, he became lecturer in mineralogy and geology at Utrecht; he added theoretical chemistry in 1846. In 1847, he was appointed professor of mathematics and from 1867 until his retirement he was professor of physics. He died in Utrecht, on 3 February 1890, aged 72.

In 1970, the lunar crater Buys-Ballot, on the far side of the Moon, was named in his honour.

== Career ==
Buys Ballot tested the Doppler effect for sound waves in 1845 by using a group of musicians playing a calibrated note on a train in the Utrecht-Amsterdam line.

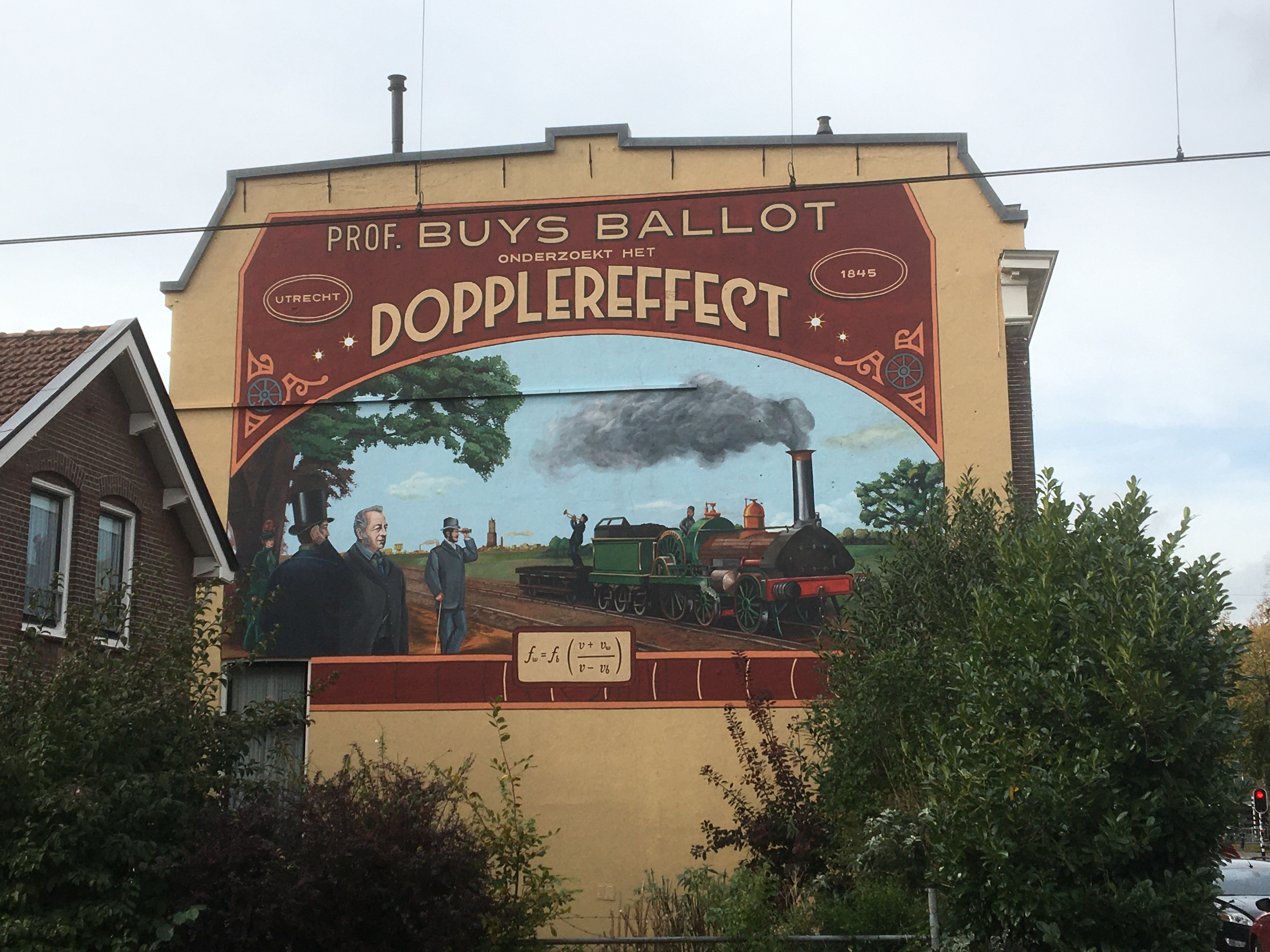
Wall art in Utrecht depicting a study of the Doppler effect

Buys Ballot is best known for his accomplishments in the field of meteorology, specifically the explanation of the direction of air flow in large weather systems. Furthermore, he founded the Royal Dutch Meteorological Institute in 1854 and he remained its chief director until his death. He was one of the first to see the need for international cooperation, and in 1873 he organized and became the first chairman of the International Meteorological Organization, a precursor of the World Meteorological Organization (WMO).

Buys Ballot's law states that if a person in the Northern Hemisphere stands with his back to the wind, the atmospheric pressure is low to the left, high to the right. His main research effort in meteorology went into examining long-time series for regularities; he was more concerned with establishing the regularities than in explaining them. He made no contributions to the theory of meteorology, despite his training in physics.

Buys Ballot devised a tabular method for investigating periodicity in time series. In 1847, he used the table now named after him to determine the period of the sun's rotation from daily observations of temperature in the Netherlands from 1729 to 1846.

Buys Ballot became member of the Royal Netherlands Academy of Arts and Sciences in 1855, an honorary member of the Finnish Society of Sciences and Letters in 1887 and was elected to honorary membership of the Manchester Literary and Philosophical Society on 19 april 1887 at the AGM.

Among his students was the prominent Dutch astronomer Jacobus Kapteyn.

== Bibliography ==
- Harold L. Burstyn "Buys Ballot, Christoph Hendrik Diederik" Dictionary of Scientific Biography volume 1, p. 628, New York: Scribners 1973.
- E. van Everdingen C. H. D. Buys Ballot 1817-1890 The Hague 1953.
- O. B. Sheynin On the History of the Statistical Method in Meteorology, Archive for the History of the Exact Sciences, 31, (1984-5) 53-95.
- J. L. Klein Statistical Visions in Time, Cambridge: Cambridge University Press 1997.
- Houdas, Y. (April 1991). "[Doppler, Buys-Ballot, Fizeau. Historical note on the discovery of the Doppler's effect]". Annales de cardiologie et d'angéiologie (in French). 40 (4): 209–13. PMID 2053764.
- Jonkman, E. J. (1980). "Doppler research in the nineteenth century". Ultrasound in Medicine & Biology. 6 (1): 1–5. doi:10.1016/0301-5629(80)90056-3. PMID 6989075.
