= Hypsometer =

Instrument for measuring height or elevation

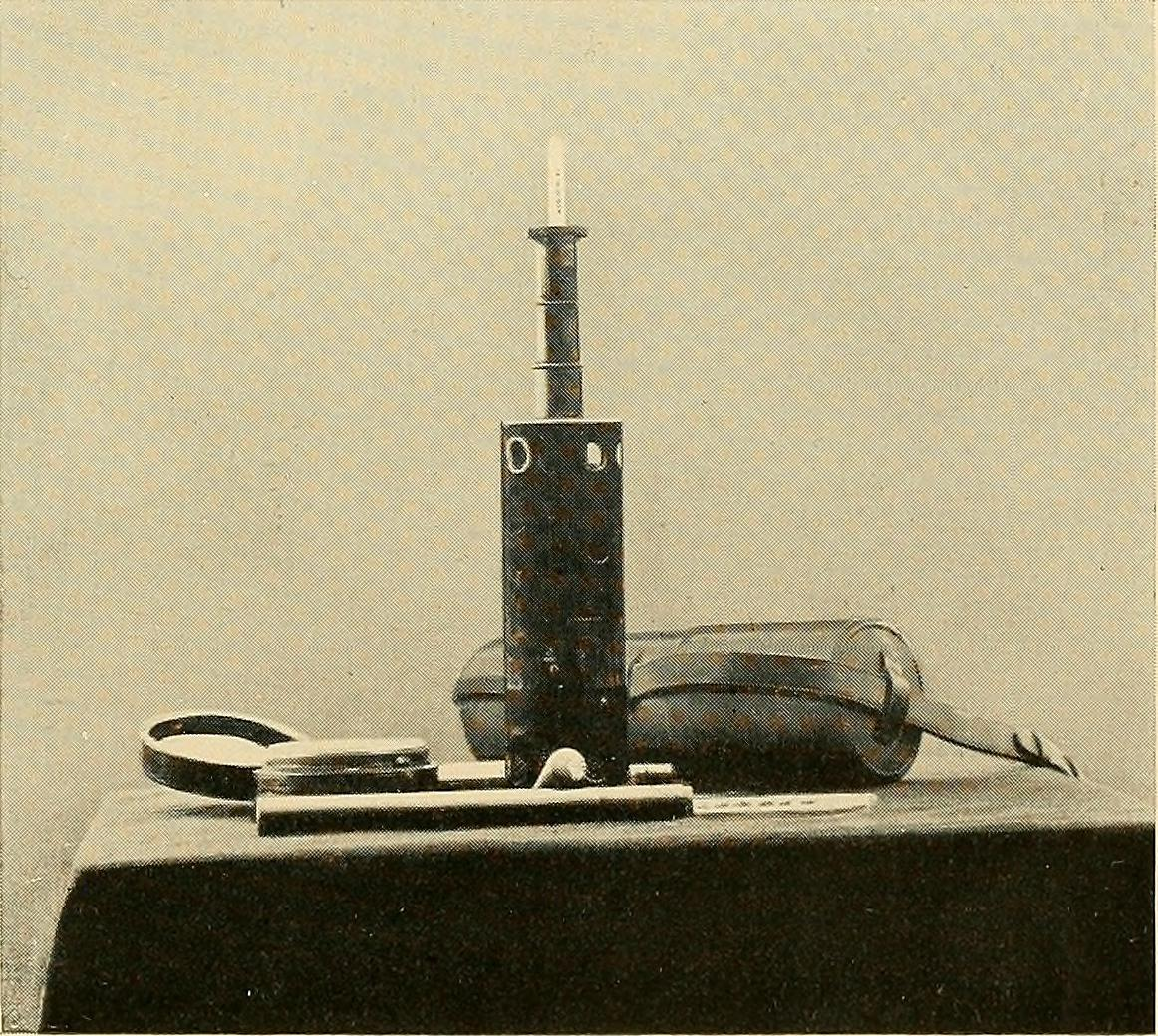
Boiling Point Apparatus or Hypsometer. Image from "Maps and survey" (1913) by Hinks, Arthur R.

A hypsometer is an instrument for measuring height or elevation. Two different principles may be used: trigonometry and atmospheric pressure.

== Etymology ==
The English word hypsometer originates from the Ancient Greek words ὕψος (húpsos, "height") and μέτρον (métron, "measure").

== Scale hypsometer ==
A simple scale hypsometer allows the height of a building or tree to be measured by sighting across a ruler to the base and top of the object being measured, when the distance from the object to the observer is known. Modern hypsometers use a combination of laser rangefinder and clinometer to measure distances to the top and bottom of objects, and the angle between the lines from the observer to each to calculate height.

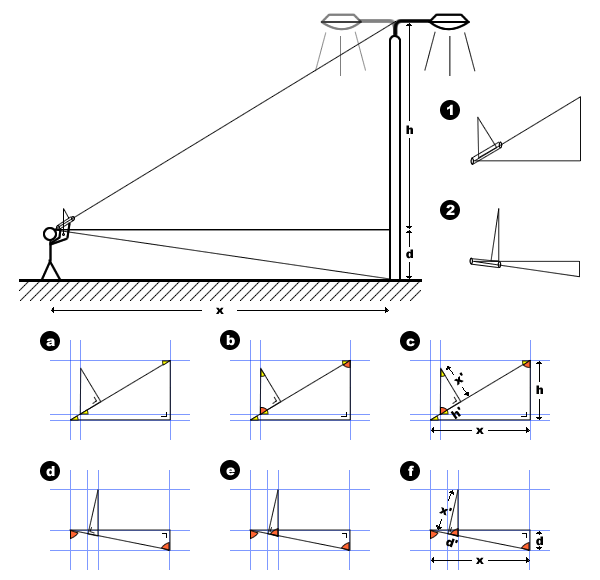

An example of such a scale hypsometer is illustrated here, and can be seen to consist of a sighting tube, a fixed horizontal scale, and an adjustable vertical scale with attached plumb line. The principle of operation of such a scale hypsometer is based on the idea of similar triangles in geometry. First the adjustable vertical scale is set at a suitable height. Then as in step 1 in the illustration, a sighting is taken on the top of the object whose height is to be determined, and the reading on the horizontal scale, h', recorded. Calculation from this value will eventually give the height h, from the eye-line of the observer to the top of the object whose height is to be determined. Similarly as in step 2 of the illustration, a sighting is taken on the base of the object whose height is to be determined, and the reading on the horizontal scale, d', recorded. Calculation from this value will eventually give the distance from the base of the object to the eye-line of the observer. Finally the distance x from the observer to the object needs to be measured.

Looking at the geometry involved in step 1 results in sketch a: two right angled triangles, shown here with the identical small angles in yellow. Next in sketch b we see that the two triangles have identical angles - each has a right angle, the same small angle shown in yellow, and the same larger angle shown in orange. Therefore in sketch c we see that using the principle of similar triangles, given that each triangle has identical angles, the sides will be in proportion: x the distance to the object in proportion to x', the height set on the vertical scale of the hypsometer, and h the height of the object above the observers eye-line in proportion to h', the reading from the horizontal scale of the hypsometer.

Given that Tan (small yellow angle) = Opposite Side / Adjacent Side, therefore Tan (small yellow angle) = h / x = h' / x'. Therefore h = h'x / x'.

Likewise the geometry involved in step 2 results in sketch d: two right angled triangles. Next in sketch e we see that the two triangles again have identical angles - each has a right angle, the same small angle shown in yellow, and the same larger angle shown in orange. Therefore in sketch f we see that using the principle of similar triangles, given that each triangle has identical angles, the sides will be in proportion: x the distance to the object in proportion to x', the height set on the vertical scale of the hypsometer, and d the depth of the object below the observers eye-line in proportion to d', the reading from the horizontal scale of the hypsometer.

Given that Tan (small angle) = Opposite Side / Adjacent Side, therefore Tan (small angle) = d / x = d' / x'. Therefore d = d'x / x'.

Thus the overall height of the object is x (d' + h') / x'

== Pressure hypsometer ==
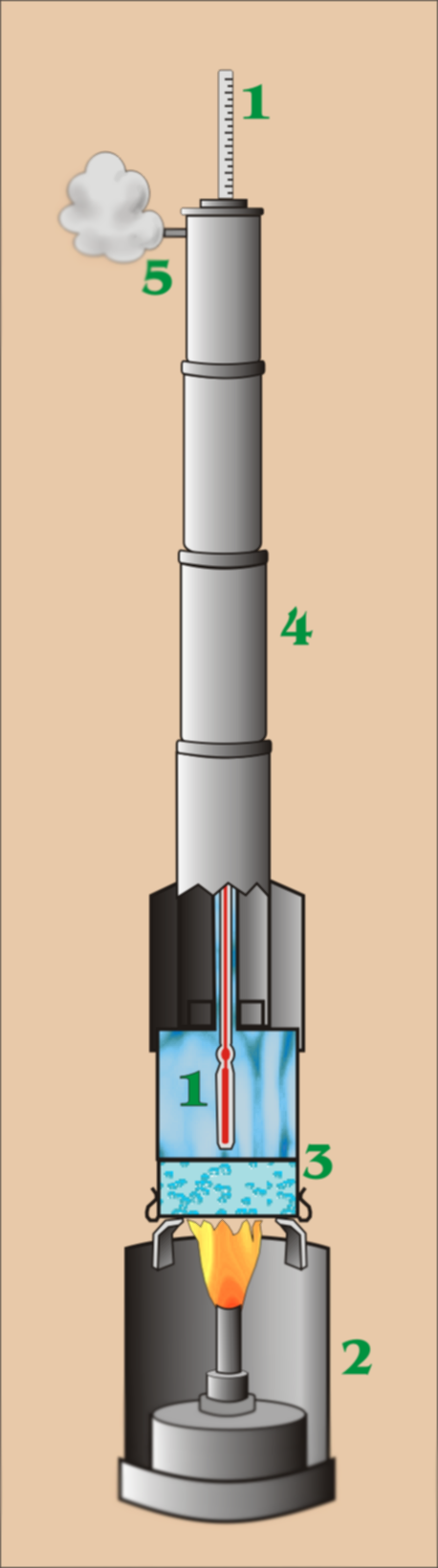

A pressure hypsometer as shown in the drawing (right) employs the principle that the boiling point of a liquid is lowered by diminishing the barometric pressure, and that the barometric pressure varies with the height of the point of observation.

The instrument consists of a cylindrical vessel in which the liquid, usually water, is boiled, surmounted by a jacketed column, in the outer partitions of which the vapour circulates, while in the central one a thermometer is placed. To deduce the height of the station from the observed boiling point, it is necessary to know the relation existing between the boiling point and pressure, and also between the pressure and height of the atmosphere.

== See also ==
- List of length, distance, or range measuring devices
- Francisco José de Caldas
