= Pressure-gradient force =

Force resulting from a difference in pressure across a surface

In fluid mechanics, the pressure-gradient force is the force that results when there is a difference in pressure across a surface. In general, a pressure is a force per unit area across a surface. A difference in pressure across a surface then implies a difference in force, which can result in an acceleration according to Newton's second law of motion, if there is no additional force to balance it. The resulting force is always directed from the region of higher-pressure to the region of lower-pressure. When a fluid is in an equilibrium state (i.e. there are no net forces, and no acceleration), the system is referred to as being in hydrostatic equilibrium. In the case of atmospheres, the pressure-gradient force is balanced by the gravitational force, maintaining hydrostatic equilibrium. In Earth's atmosphere, for example, air pressure decreases at altitudes above Earth's surface, thus providing a pressure-gradient force which counteracts the force of gravity on the atmosphere.

== Magnus effect ==
The Magnus effect is an observable phenomenon that is commonly associated with a spinning object moving through a fluid. The path of the spinning object is deflected in a manner that is not present when the object is not spinning. The deflection can be explained by the difference in pressure of the fluid on opposite sides of the spinning object. The Magnus effect is dependent on the speed of rotation.

== Formalism ==
Consider a cubic parcel of fluid with a density $\rho$, a height $dz$, and a surface area $dA$. The mass of the parcel can be expressed as, $m = \rho \, dA \, dz$. Using Newton's second law, $F = m a$, we can then examine a pressure difference $dP$ (assumed to be only in the $z$-direction) to find the resulting force, $F = - dP \, dA = \rho a \, dA \, dz$.

The acceleration resulting from the pressure gradient is then, $a = -\frac{1}{\rho} \frac{dP}{dz} .$

The effects of the pressure gradient are usually expressed in this way, in terms of an acceleration, instead of in terms of a force. We can express the acceleration more precisely, for a general pressure $P$ as, $\vec{a} = -\frac{1}{\rho} \vec\nabla P.$

The direction of the resulting force (acceleration) is thus in the opposite direction of the most rapid increase of pressure.
