= Tide-Predicting Machine No. 2 =

Mechanical analog computer

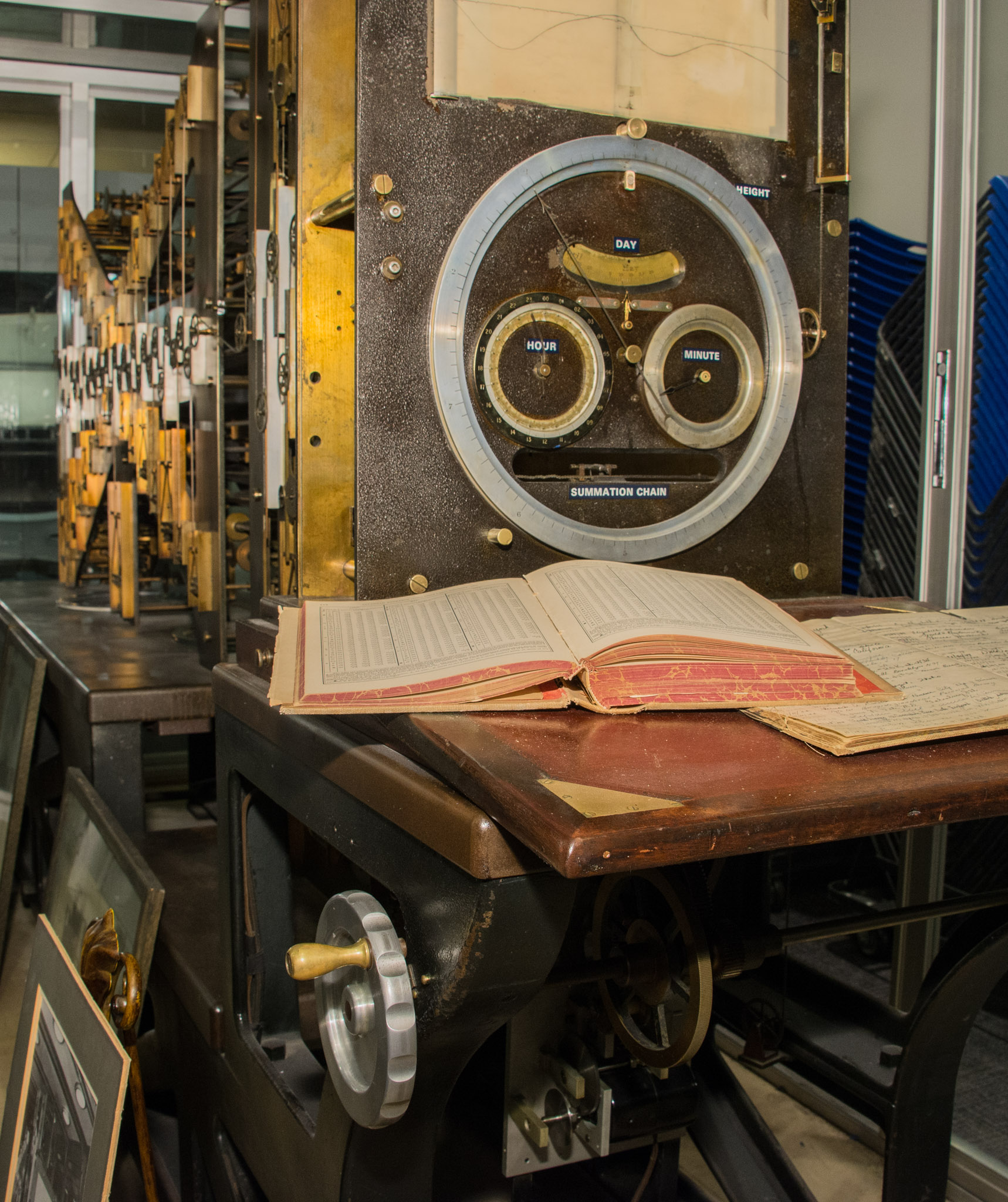
- Tide Predicting Machine No. 2
- Date invented: 1895
- Manufacturer: United States Coast and Geodetic Survey
- Introduced: 1910
- Discontinued: 1965
- Weight: 2,500 pounds (1,134 kg)
- Dimensions: 10.8 feet (3.3 m) long, 6.2 feet (1.9 m) high, 2 feet (0.6 m) wide

Tide-Predicting Machine No. 2, also known as Old Brass Brains, was a special-purpose mechanical computer that uses gears, pulleys, chains, and other mechanical components to compute the height and time of high and low tides for specific locations. The machine can perform tide calculations much faster than a person could do with pencil and paper. The United States Coast and Geodetic Survey put the machine into operation in 1910. It was used until 1965, when it was replaced by an electronic computer.

== Early U.S. tide-prediction efforts ==
Tides are the rise and fall of sea levels caused by the combined effects of gravitational forces exerted by the Moon, Sun, and rotation of the Earth. In 1867 the United States Coast Survey started printing annual tide tables to support safe and effective maritime, coastal, and defense activities. Before long, these tables showed the times and heights of high and low tides to the nearest minute and tenth of a foot, respectively. Tables were printed for a year at a time and distributed prior to the start of the year.

The prediction of tides is very challenging as it depends on multiple factors–including the alignment of the Sun and Moon, the shape of the coastline, and near-shore bathymetry. Tide theories attempt to account for these factors but lead to complex calculations. Originally, calculations were performed by hand, which was very labor-intensive and error-prone. The burden became even larger when the United States Coast and Geodetic Survey (as the U.S. Coast Survey was renamed in 1878) started using the more accurate harmonic method for predictions of tides in 1884.

To significantly reduce the work required to predict tides, in 1881 William Ferrel of the Coast and Geodetic Survey designed a tide-predicting machine. Fauth & Co. Instrument Makers built Tide-Predicting Machine No. 1 and delivered it in 1882. The Survey started using the machine routinely in 1883.

== History and mechanism ==
In 1895 the Coast and Geodetic Survey grew concerned because Tide-Predicting Machine No. 1 had developed considerable wear from almost constant use over 12 years. The office decided to construct a new machine that was faster, more accurate, and more reliable. This became Tide-Predicting Machine No. 2.

Rolin Harris and E. G. Fischer of the Coast and Geodetic Survey led the effort. The design team studied previous British and U.S. tide-predicting machines and incorporated their best attributes in the design of the new machine. The machine, also known as “Old Brass Brains”, used an intricate arrangement of gears, pulleys, slides, and other components. The design of the new machine was approved in 1895, and construction began in 1896.

Tide-Predicting Machine No. 2 was the first tide-predicting machine to incorporate both a paper graph of the tides–the approach used by earlier British machines–and dials and scales that showed the tide height and corresponding date and time–used by Tide-Predicting Machine No. 1. The dials and scales made it much easier for an operator to precisely determine the height and time of high and low tides. The paper graph, referred to as a tide curve, was very useful as a record of the computation that could be checked later to confirm the calculations were performed correctly.

A hand crank turned by the operator provides the power for the machine's mechanical calculations. Battery-powered electrical circuits are used to mark the start of hours and days on the paper graph and to stop the machine when high and low tides were reached so the operator can note the height and time.

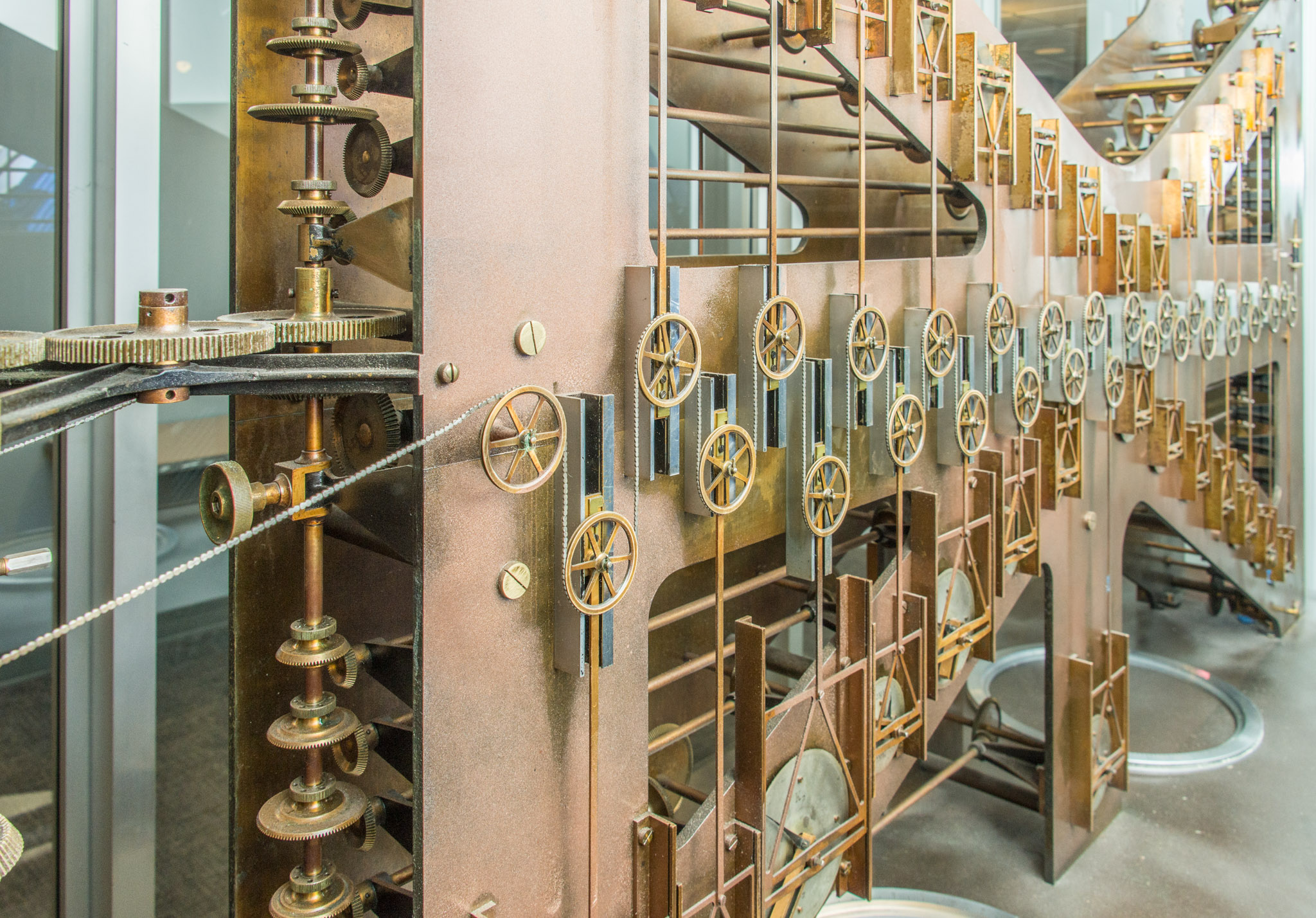
This photo shows the largest of the three sections of Tide-Predicting Machine No. 2. The gears on the left transmit power from the hand crank. The components on the right contribute to the computation of the time of high and low tides.

Much consideration was given to the mechanical characteristics of the components to ensure reliability and accuracy. For instance, some components that were hard to replace were designed with a 50-year lifetime. Also, the summation chains were moved across gears under tension for a year of work days before being installed in the machine to ensure they were sufficiently flexible and their length would remain constant.

Other work in the Coast and Geodetic Survey took precedence over construction of the new machine, and a reduction in staff levels precluded all work on the new machine for three years. As a result, Tide-Predicting Machine No. 2 was not functional until 1910. It was first applied to predicting values for the 1912 and 1913 tide tables. Then the machine was disassembled, polished, plated, lacquered, and reassembled in time to provide predictions for the 1914 tide tables. Comparisons of the accuracy of the mechanical predictions of tides compared to hand calculations for two challenging locations demonstrated errors in heights of 0.72 inches (1.83 cm) or less.

Old Brass Brains is 10.8 feet (3.3 m) long, 6.2 feet (1.9 m) high, 2 feet (0.6 m) wide and weighs approximately 2,500 pounds (1,134 kg).

== Use ==
To compute tides for a coastal location, the operator has to configure the machine for that location. This is done by adjusting physical settings on the machine based on up to 37 factors. Those factors are determined empirically by harmonic analysis of a time series of tides at the location, and represent the influence of the moon, sun, depth of bay, offshore islands, etc. Once computed the factors for a location can be applied to past and future years. and are shared widely so anyone can perform tide calculations.

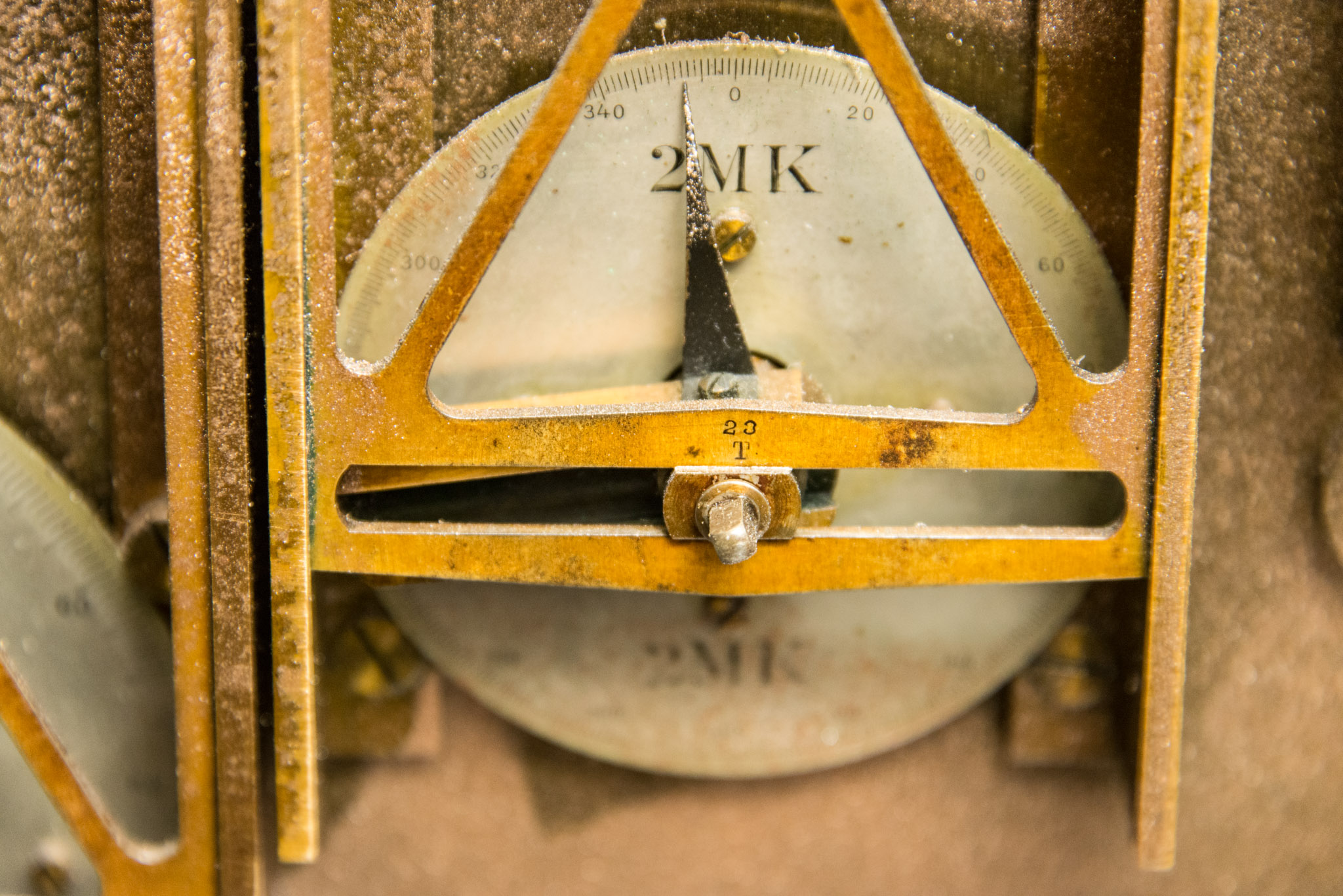
A tide formula component crank on Tide-Predicting Machine No. 2. The mechanical arrangement (a slotted crank yoke) converts circular motion to a vertical motion that traces a sinusoid. The operator adjusts the position of the pin on the crank to represent a component of the tide formula at a specific coastal port before starting computations. The pin position affects the amplitude and phase of the sinusoid.

Assuming the factors for a location are known, configuring the machine to compute tides for the location requires 2.5–4 hours. Predictions for a year's tides at that location can then be produced in 8–15 hours. The calculations Tide-Predicting Machine No. 2 can perform in 1 day would require a person 125 days to perform by hand.

Around 1915, the machine was used to produce annual tide tables for 70 major ports worldwide. Additional ports were added in later years.

During World War II the Coast and Geodetic Survey produced annual tide tables for major ports four years in advance in case Old Brass Brains broke down or was sabotaged. The Coast and Geodetic Survey also provided tide predictions for a number of additional locations in the Pacific, including potential locations for amphibious invasions. Obtaining tide observations for those locations to support computation of the factors required for predictions was often a significant challenge.

Around 1960 Old Brass Brains was modified to replace the hand crank with an electric motor and to add an automatic readout of heights and times. In 1965, the Coast and Geodetic Survey retired the Tide-Predicting Machine No. 2, 55 years after it entered service, and started performing its tide calculations with an electronic computer.

== Current status ==
The National Oceanic and Atmospheric Administration (NOAA) maintains Tide-Predicting Machine No. 2 in working condition. The machine is at NOAA's facility in Silver Spring, Maryland. The public can occasionally view the machine during events such as the NOAA Open House.

== Mathematical basis ==
Tide Predicting Machine No. 2 is based on the first accurate mathematical approach for predicting tides, which was developed around 1867 by Sir William Thomson (who later became Lord Kelvin) and later refined by Sir George Darwin. This approach, called “harmonic analysis,” approximates tide heights by a summation of cosine terms, each of which has a different frequency. The formula for sea height is represented as

$$H_0 + A_1 \cos(\omega_1 t+\varphi_1)+A_2 \cos(\omega_2 t+\varphi_2)+A_3 \cos(\omega_3 t+\varphi_3)+\cdots$$

containing 10, 20 or even more trigonometric terms. $H_0$ is the height of mean sea level. For each term $i = 1, \ldots, n$, $A_i$ is the amplitude of the term's contribution to tide height above mean sea level, $\omega_i$ determines the frequency of the term, $t$ is the time, and $\phi_i$ is the relative phase of the term. This is the equation computed by most tide-predicting machines, including Old Brass Brains which handles 37 such terms.

The frequencies $\omega_i$ are determined from astronomical considerations, which were determined by Thomson and Darwin and have been almost universally used. For instance one speed represents the speed of a theoretical moon with a uniform speed in a circular orbit in the equatorial plane. Other components with their own speeds correct for the differences between the orbit of that theoretical moon and the real Moon. The coefficients $A_i$ and $\phi_i$ are determined by Fourier analysis of a time series of tide heights. This analysis can be performed with a record as short as two weeks but a 369-day sample is standard. The longer sample minimizes the errors introduced by wind storms, freshets, and other non-regular influences.

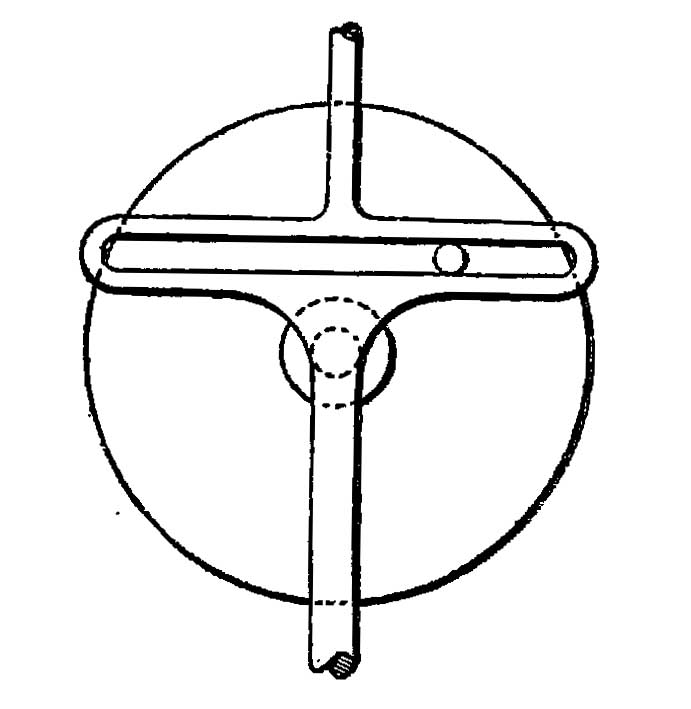
mechanism for generating sinusoidal motion component

To compute those terms the Coast and Geodetic Survey designers incorporated the same "slotted yoke crank" approach for mechanically computing cosines as Thomson used, shown in the schematic (right). A rotating drive-wheel ("crank") is fitted with an off-center peg. A shaft with a horizontally-slotted section is free to move vertically up and down. The wheel's off-center peg is located in the slot. As a result, when the peg moves around with the wheel, it makes the shaft move up and down within limits. As a result of this arrangement when the drive-wheel rotates uniformly, say clockwise, the shaft moves sinusoidally up and down. The vertical position of the center of the slot, at any time $t$, can then be expressed as $A_1 \cos(\omega_1 t+\phi_1)$, where $A_1$ is the radial distance from the wheel's center to the peg, $\omega_1$ is the rate at which the wheel turns (in radians per unit of time) and is determined by gears, and $\phi_1$ is the starting phase angle of the peg, measured in radians from the 12 o'clock position to the angular position where the peg was at time zero. An operator adjusted the location of each pin based on the empirically computed parameters for a port's tides. This arrangement makes a physical analog of just one term in the tide equation. Old Brass Brains computes 37 such terms.

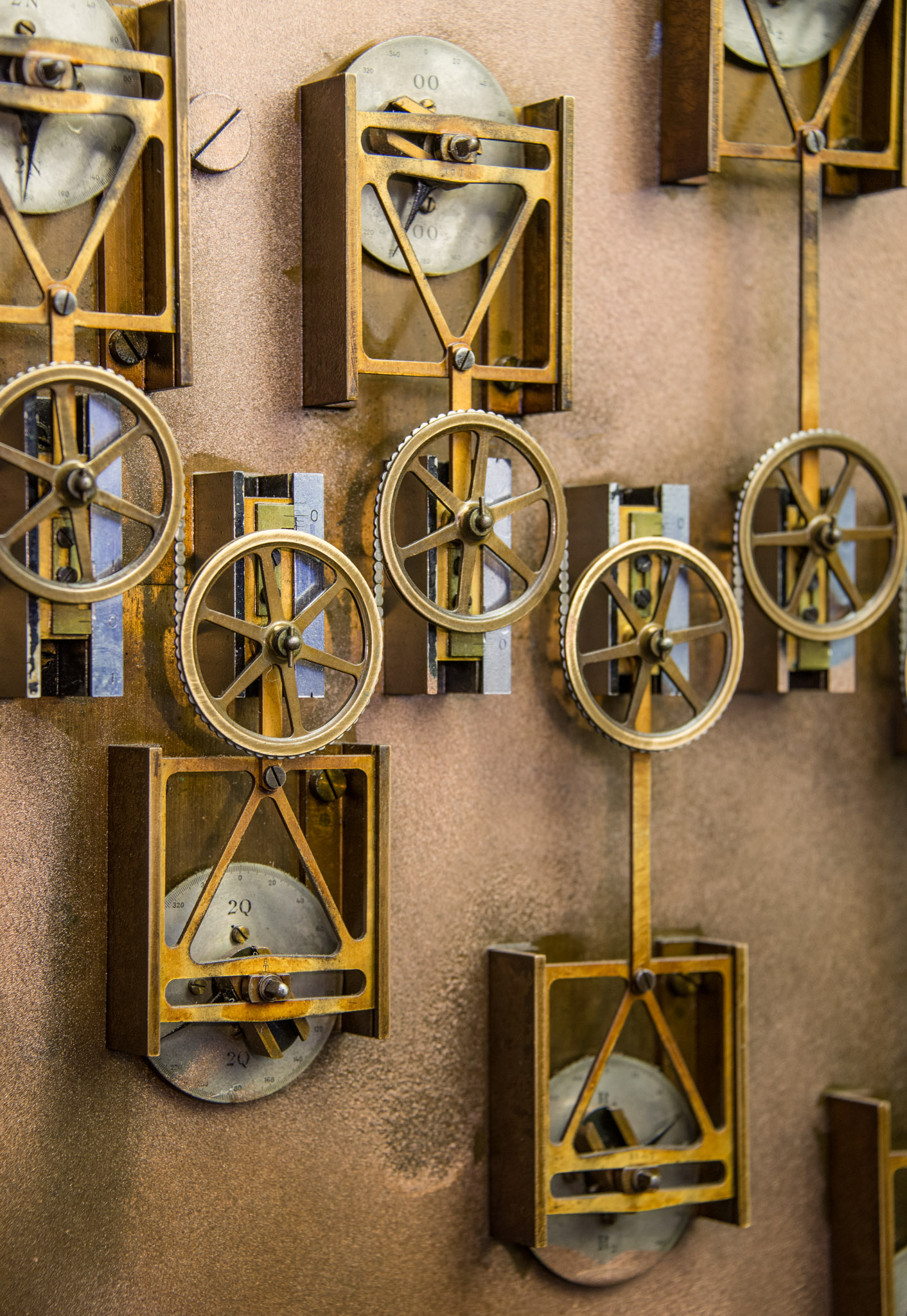
The slotted yoke cranks at the top and bottom (with the triangular pieces) move vertically in a sinusoidal pattern. The locations of their pins determine their amplitudes and phases, representing factors in the tide equation. The pulleys across the center move with the attached cranks. The summation chain above and below the pulleys sums their influences.

The Coast and Geodetic Survey designers also adopted from the earlier British machines the approach of summing terms by passing a chain over and under pulleys attached to the vertically oscillating yokes. The amount of chain remaining after passing over and under pulleys indicated the sum of the terms. For example, a large value for a term would move its pulley further from a neutral position, deflecting the chain, and reducing the amount of excess chain remaining in system.

One side of Old Brass Brains is used to compute the height of the tide. A similar arrangement of components on the other side, but with cranks 90 degrees out of phase, represents the derivative with respect to time of the tide height formula. When the derivative is zero the time of high or low tide has been reached. An electrical circuit detects this condition and stops the machine so the operator can record the date, time, and tide height.

== Gallery ==
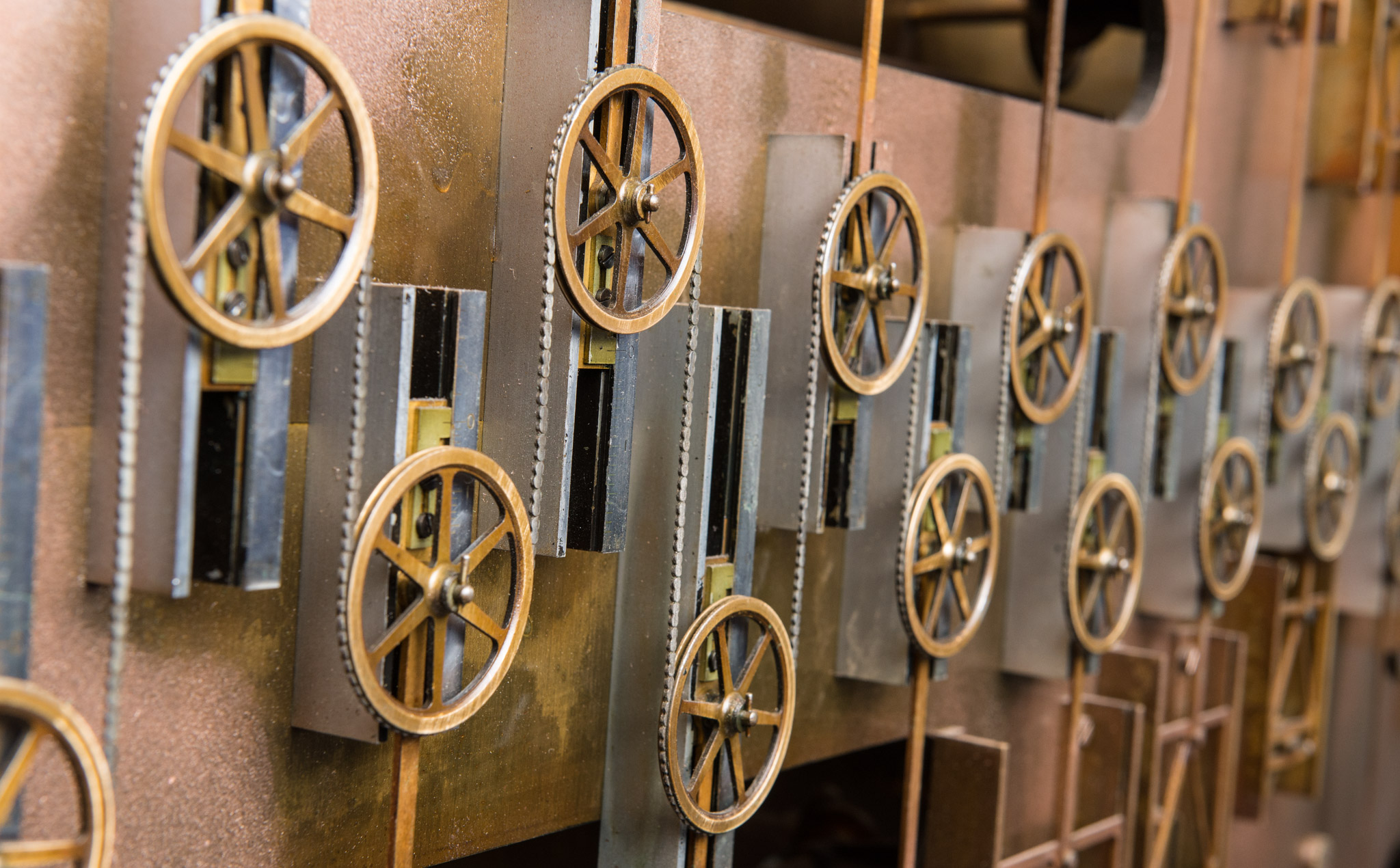
The pulleys move up and down in a sinusoidal motion, representing components of the tide equation. The summation chain that passes above and below the pulleys sums their influences.

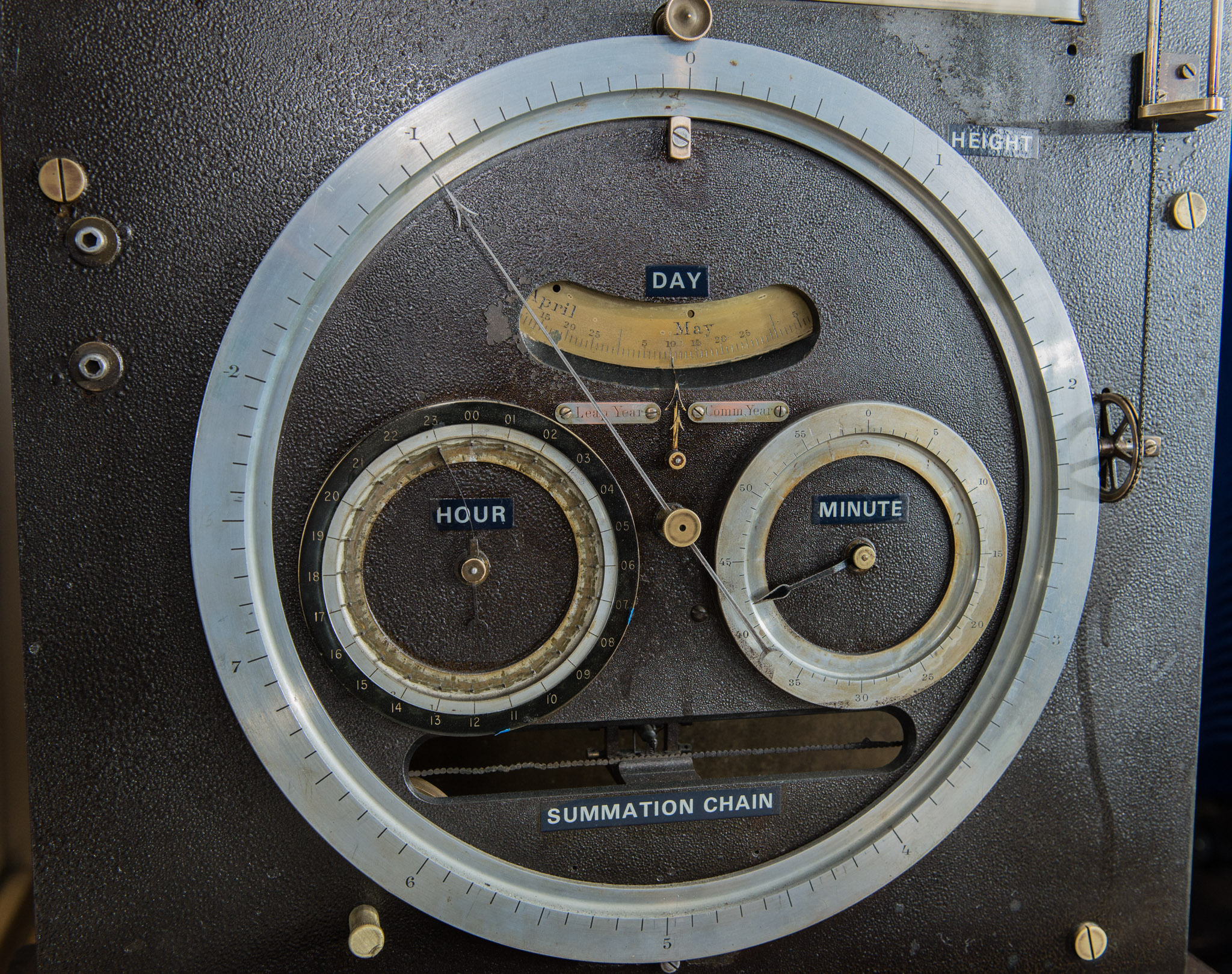
The operator reads the height and time of high and low tides from these dials and scales.

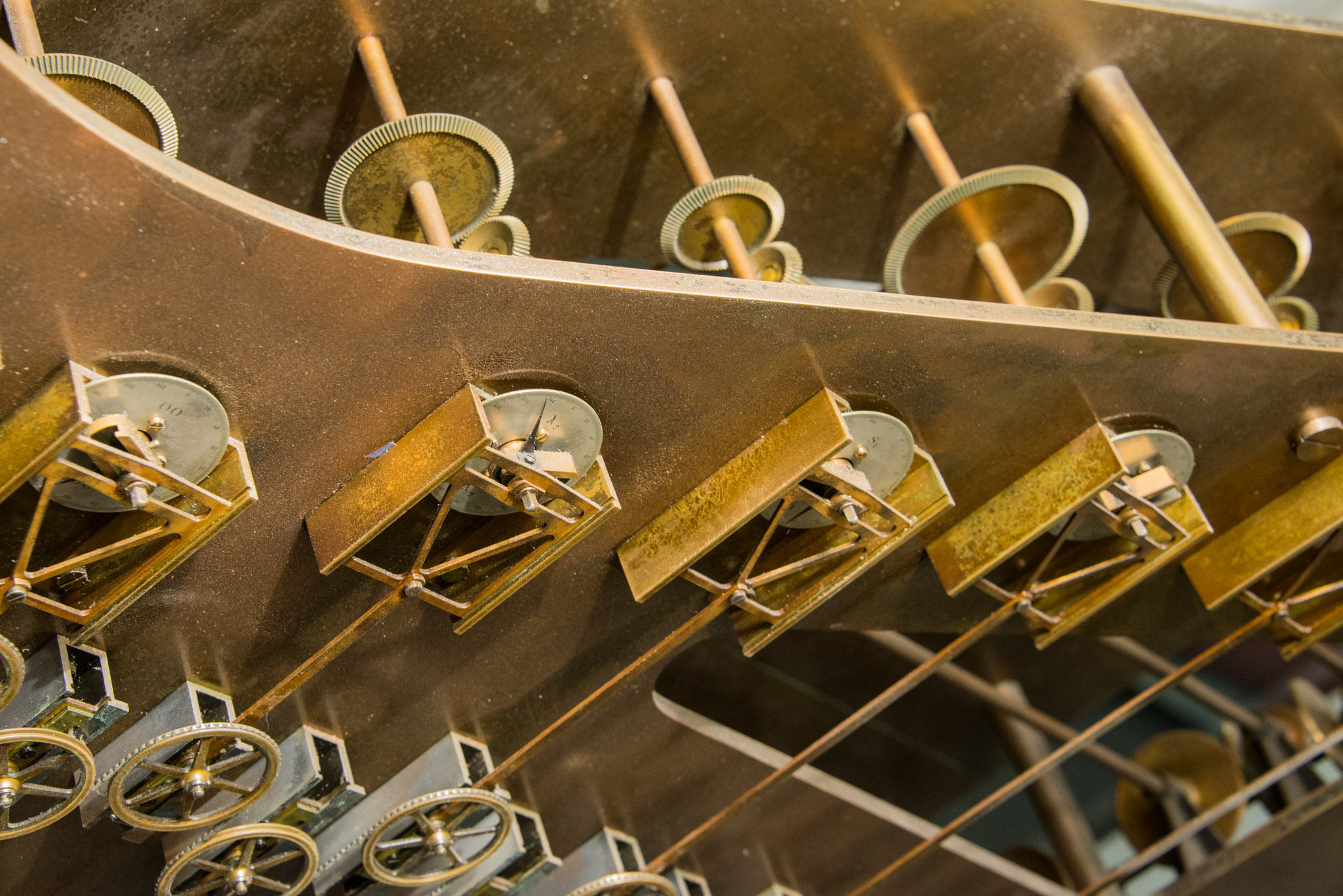
This photo shows both the top and one side of Tide Predicting Machine No. 2. The tide prediction formula implemented by the machine includes the addition of a series of cosine terms. The triangular metal pieces are part of slotted yoke cranks which convert circular motion to a vertical motion that traces a sinusoid. Each slotted yoke crank is connected by a shaft to a pulley, which causes the pulley to follow the sinusoidal motion. A chain going over and under pulleys sums each of their deflections to compute the tide. Along the top of the photo, connecting shafts drive slotted yoke cranks on both sides of the machine. One side of the machine computes the height of tides while the other determines the times of high and low tides.

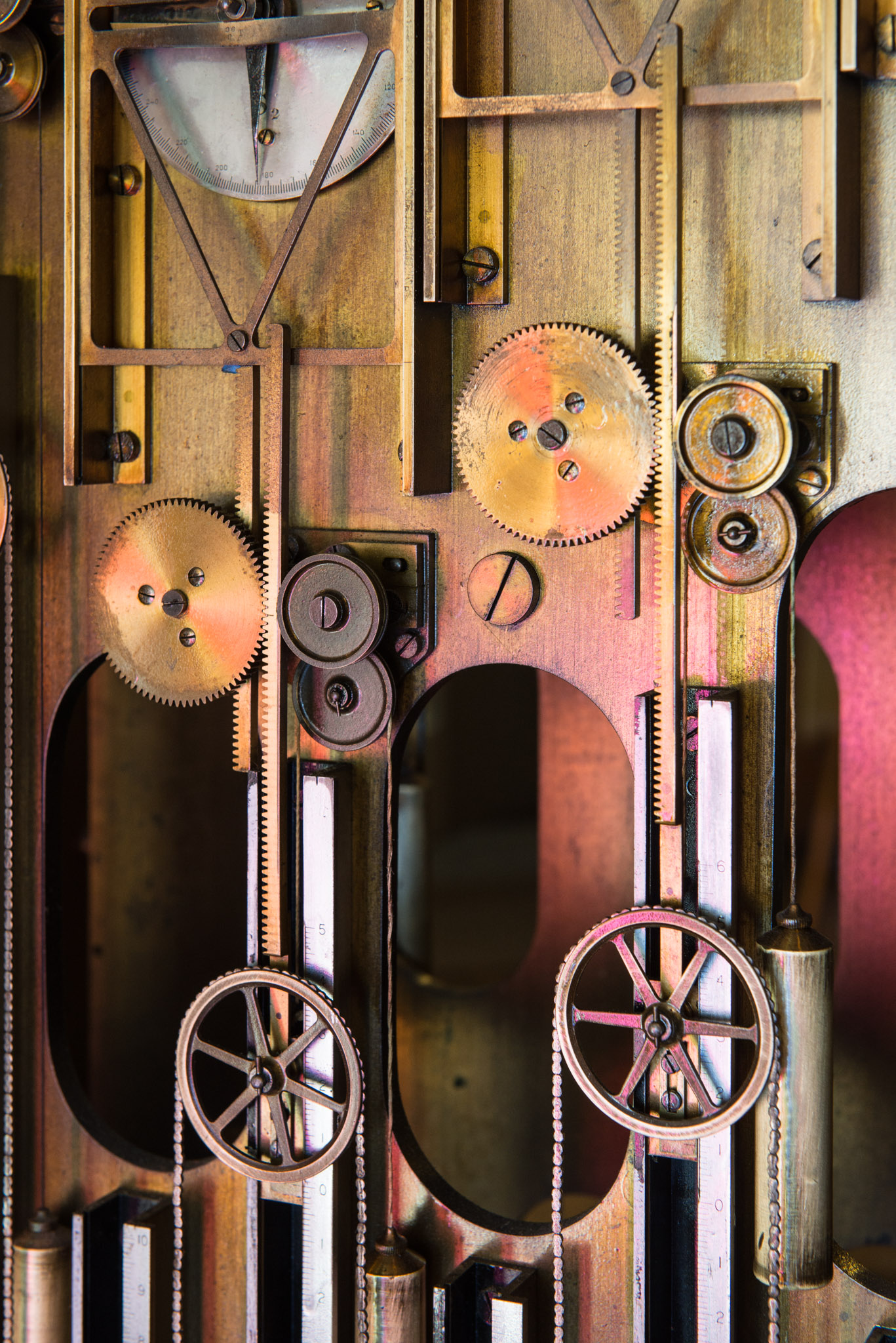
Internals: the machine uses an intricate arrangement of gears, pulleys, chains, slides, and other mechanical components to perform the computations.
