= Tide-predicting machine =

Mechanical analog computer

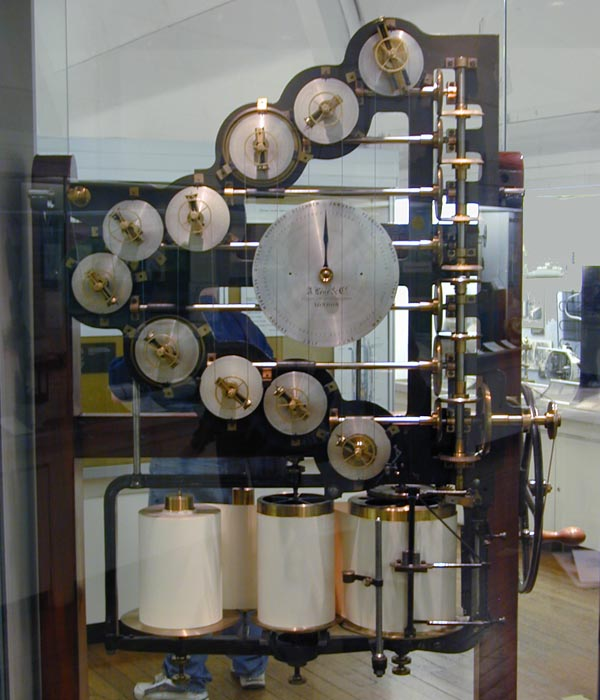
10-component tide-predicting machine of 1872–73, conceived by Sir William Thomson (Lord Kelvin), and designed by Thomson and collaborators, at the Science Museum, South Kensington, London

A tide-predicting machine was a special-purpose mechanical analog computer of the late 19th and early 20th centuries, constructed and set up to predict the ebb and flow of sea tides and the irregular variations in their heights – which change in mixtures of rhythms, that never (in the aggregate) repeat themselves exactly. Its purpose was to shorten the laborious and error-prone computations of tide-prediction. Such machines usually provided predictions valid from hour to hour and day to day for a year or more ahead.

The first tide-predicting machine, designed and built in 1872–73, and followed by two larger machines on similar principles in 1876 and 1879, was conceived by Sir William Thomson. Thomson had introduced the method of harmonic analysis of tidal patterns in the 1860s and the first machine was designed by Thomson with the collaboration of Edward Roberts (1845–1933, assistant at the UK HM Nautical Almanac Office), and of Alexander Légé, who constructed it.

In the US, another tide-predicting machine on a different pattern was designed by William Ferrel and built in 1881–82. Developments and improvements continued in the UK, US and Germany through the first half of the 20th century. The machines became widely used for constructing official tidal predictions for general marine navigation. They came to be regarded as of military strategic importance during World War I, and again during the Second World War, when the US No.2 Tide Predicting Machine, described below, was classified, along with the data that it produced, and used to predict tides for the D-Day Normandy landings and all the island landings in the Pacific War. Military interest in such machines continued even for some time afterwards. They were made obsolete by digital electronic computers that can be programmed to carry out similar computations, but the tide-predicting machines continued in use until the 1960s and 1970s.

Several examples of tide-predicting machines remain on display as museum-pieces, occasionally put into operation for demonstration purposes, monuments to the mathematical and mechanical ingenuity of their creators.

== Background ==
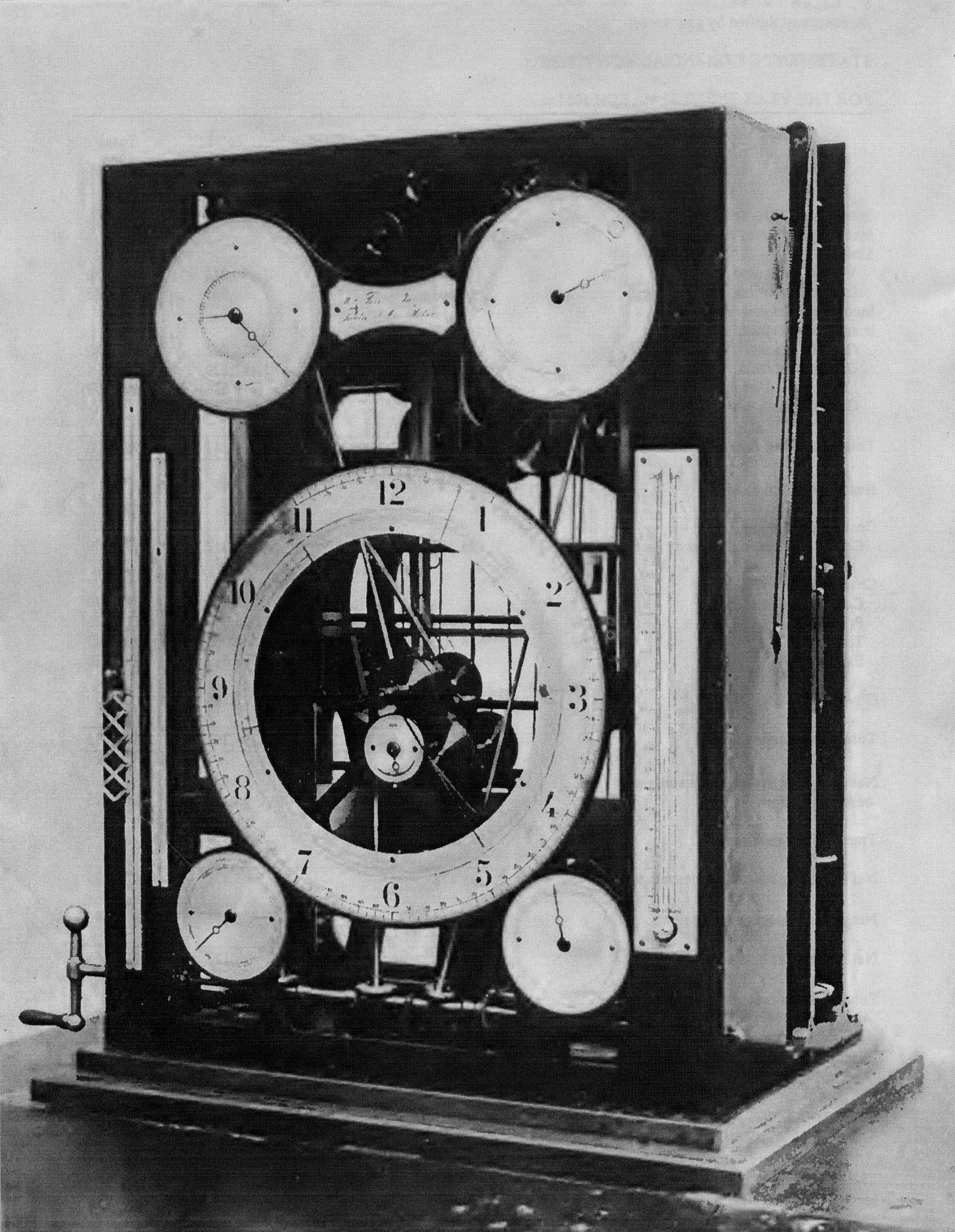
William Ferrel's tide-predicting machine of 1881–82, now at the Smithsonian National Museum of American History

Modern scientific study of tides dates back to Isaac Newton's Principia of 1687, in which he applied the theory of gravitation to make a first approximation of the effects of the Moon and Sun on the Earth's tidal waters. The approximation developed by Newton and his successors of the next 90 years is known as the 'equilibrium theory' of tides.

Beginning in 1776, Pierre-Simon Laplace made a fundamental advance on the equilibrium approximation, with the first description of oceanic tidal waters' dynamic responses to the tide-generating forces due to the Moon and Sun.

Laplace's improvements in theory were substantial, but they still left prediction in an approximate state. This position changed in the 1860s when the local circumstances of tidal phenomena were more fully brought into account by William Thomson's application of Fourier analysis to the tidal motions. Thomson's work in this field was then further developed and extended by George Darwin, the second son of Charles Darwin: George Darwin's work was based on the lunar theory current in his time. His symbols for the tidal harmonic constituents are still used. Darwin's harmonic developments of the tide-generating forces were later brought by A. T. Doodson up to date and extended in light of the new and more accurate lunar theory of E. W. Brown that remained current through most of the twentieth century.

The state to which the science of tide-prediction had arrived by the 1870s can be summarized: Astronomical theories of the Moon and Sun had identified the frequencies and strengths of different components of the tide-generating force. Combining Moon and Sun forces was described by W. K. Clifford: "The use of the jointed parallelogram opqr for compounding harmonic motions of different periods is exemplified in Sir W. Thomson's Tidal Clock. The clock has two hands whose lengths are proportional to the solar and lunar tides respectively, while their periods of revolution are equal to the periods of those tides. A jointed parallelogram is constructed, having the hands of the clock for two sides. If the clock is properly set, the height of that extremity of the parallelogram which is furthest from the centre will be continually proportional to the height of the compound tide."

But effective prediction at any given place called for measurement of an adequate sample of local tidal observations, to show the local tidal response at those different frequencies, in amplitude and phase. Those observations had then to be analyzed, to derive the coefficients and phase angles. Then, for purposes of prediction, those local tidal constants had to be recombined, each with a different component of the tide-generating forces to which it applied, and at each of a sequence of future dates and times, and then the different elements finally collected together to obtain their aggregate effects. In the age when calculations were done by hand and brain, with pencil, paper and tables, this was recognized as an immensely laborious and error-prone undertaking.

Thomson recognized that what was needed was a convenient and preferably automated way to evaluate repeatedly the sum of tidal terms such as:
$$A_1 \cos(\omega_1 t+\phi_1)+A_2 \cos(\omega_2 t+\phi_2)+A_3 \cos(\omega_3 t+\phi_3)+\ldots$$
containing 10, 20 or even more trigonometrical terms, so that the computation could conveniently be repeated in full for each of a very large number of different chosen values of the date/time $t$. This was the core of the problem solved by the tide-predicting machines.

== Principle ==
Thomson conceived his aim as to construct a mechanism that would evaluate this trigonometrical sum physically, e.g. as the vertical position of a pen that could then plot a curve on a moving band of paper.

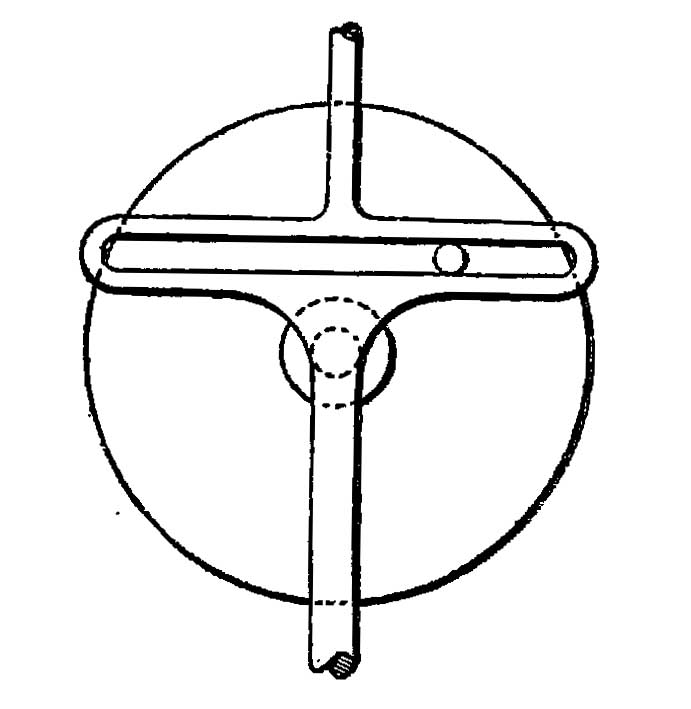
mechanism for generating sinusoidal motion component

There were several mechanisms available to him for converting rotary motion into sinusoidal motion. One of them is shown in the schematic (right). A rotating drive-wheel is fitted with an off-center peg. A shaft with a horizontally-slotted section is free to move vertically up and down. The wheel's off-center peg is located in the slot. As a result, when the peg moves around with the wheel, it can make the shaft move up and down within limits. This arrangement shows that when the drive-wheel rotates uniformly, say clockwise, the shaft moves sinusoidally up and down. The vertical position of the center of the slot, at any time $t$, can then be expressed as
$$A_1 \cos(\omega_1 t+\phi_1),$$
where $A_1$ is the radial distance from the wheel's center to the peg, $\omega_1$ is the rate at which the wheel turns (in radians per unit of time), and $\phi_1$ is the starting phase angle of the peg, measured in radians from the 12 o'clock position to the angular position where the peg was at time zero.

This arrangement makes a physical analog of just one trigonometrical term. Thomson needed to construct a physical sum of many such terms.

At first he inclined to use gears. Then he discussed the problem with engineer Beauchamp Tower before the British Association meeting in 1872, and Tower suggested the use of a device that (as he remembered) was once used by Wheatstone. It was a chain running alternately over and under a sequence of pulleys on movable shafts. The chain was fixed at one end, and the other (free) end was weighted to keep it taut. As each shaft moved up or down it would take up or release a corresponding length of the chain. The movements in position of the free (movable) end of the chain represented the sum of the movements of the different shafts. The movable end was kept taut, and fitted with a pen and a moving band of paper on which the pen plotted a tidal curve. In some designs, the movable end of the line was connected instead to a dial and scale from which tidal heights could be read off.

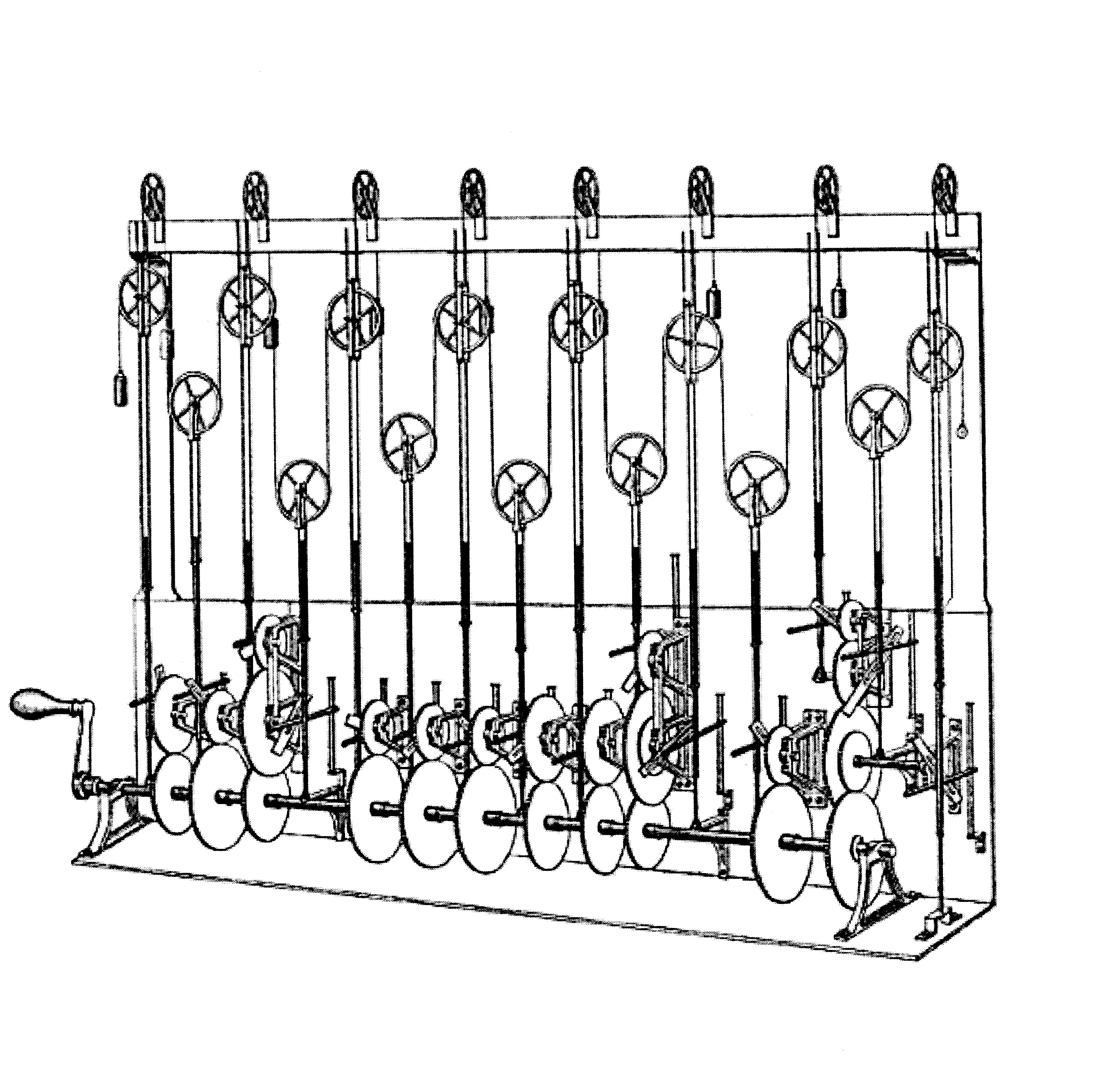
Thomson's design for the third tide-predicting machine, 1879–1881

One of Thomson's designs for the calculating part of a tide-predicting machine is shown in the figure (right), closely similar to the third machine of 1879–1881. A long cord, with one end held fixed, passed vertically upwards and over a first upper pulley, then vertically downwards and under the next, and so on. These pulleys were all moved up and down by cranks, and each pulley took in or let out cord according to the direction in which it moved. These cranks were all moved by trains of wheels gearing into the wheels fixed on a drive shaft. The greatest number of teeth on any wheel was 802 engaging with another of 423. All the other wheels had comparatively small numbers of teeth. A flywheel of great inertia enabled the operator to turn the machine fast, without jerking the pulleys, and so to run off a year's curve in about twenty-five minutes. The machine shown in the figure was arranged for fifteen constituents in all.

Thomson acknowledged that the use of an over-and-under arrangement of the flexible line that summed the motion components was suggested to him in August 1872 by engineer Beauchamp Tower.

== History ==
=== The Kelvin machine ===
The first tide predicting machine (TPM) was built in 1872 by the Légé Engineering Company. A model of it was exhibited at the British Association meeting in 1873 (for computing 8 tidal components), followed in 1875–1876 by a machine on a slightly larger scale (for computing 10 tidal components), was designed by Sir William Thomson (who later became Lord Kelvin). The 10-component machine and results obtained from it were shown at the Paris Exhibition in 1878.

Thomson was also responsible for originating the method of harmonic tidal analysis, and for devising a harmonic analyzer machine, which partly mechanized the evaluation of the constants from the gauge readings.

=== The Roberts machine ===
An enlarged and improved version of the machine, for computing 20 tidal components, was built for the Government of India in 1879, and then modified in 1881 to extend it to compute 24 harmonic components. British Tide Predictor No.2, after initial use to generate data for Indian ports, was used for tide prediction for the British empire beyond India, and transferred to the National Physical Laboratory in 1903. British Tide Predictor No.3 was sold to the French Government in 1900 and used to generate French tide tables.

In these machines, the prediction was delivered in the form of a continuous graphical pen-plot of tidal height against time. The plot was marked with hour- and noon-marks, and was made by the machine on a moving band of paper as the mechanism was turned. A year's tidal predictions for a given place, usually a chosen seaport, could be plotted by the 1876 and 1879 machines in about four hours (but the drives had to be rewound during that time).

=== Ferrel machine, US Tide Predicting Machine No. 1 ===
In 1881–82, another tide predicting machine, operating quite differently, was designed by William Ferrel and built in Washington under Ferrel's direction by E. G. Fischer (who later designed the successor machine described below, which was in operation at the US Coast and Geodetic Survey from 1912 until the 1960s). Ferrel's machine delivered predictions by telling the times and heights of successive high and low waters, shown by pointer-readings on dials and scales. These were read by an operator who copied the readings on to forms, to be sent to the printer of the US tide-tables.

These machines had to be set with local tidal constants special to the place for which predictions were to be made. Such numbers express the local tidal response to individual components of the global tide-generating potential, at different frequencies. This local response, shown in the timing and the height of tidal contributions at different frequencies, is a result of local and regional features of the coasts and sea-bed. The tidal constants are usually evaluated from local histories of tide-gauge observations, by harmonic analysis based on the principal tide-generating frequencies as shown by the global theory of tides and the underlying lunar theory.

Development and improvement based on the experience of these early machines continued through the first half of the 20th century.

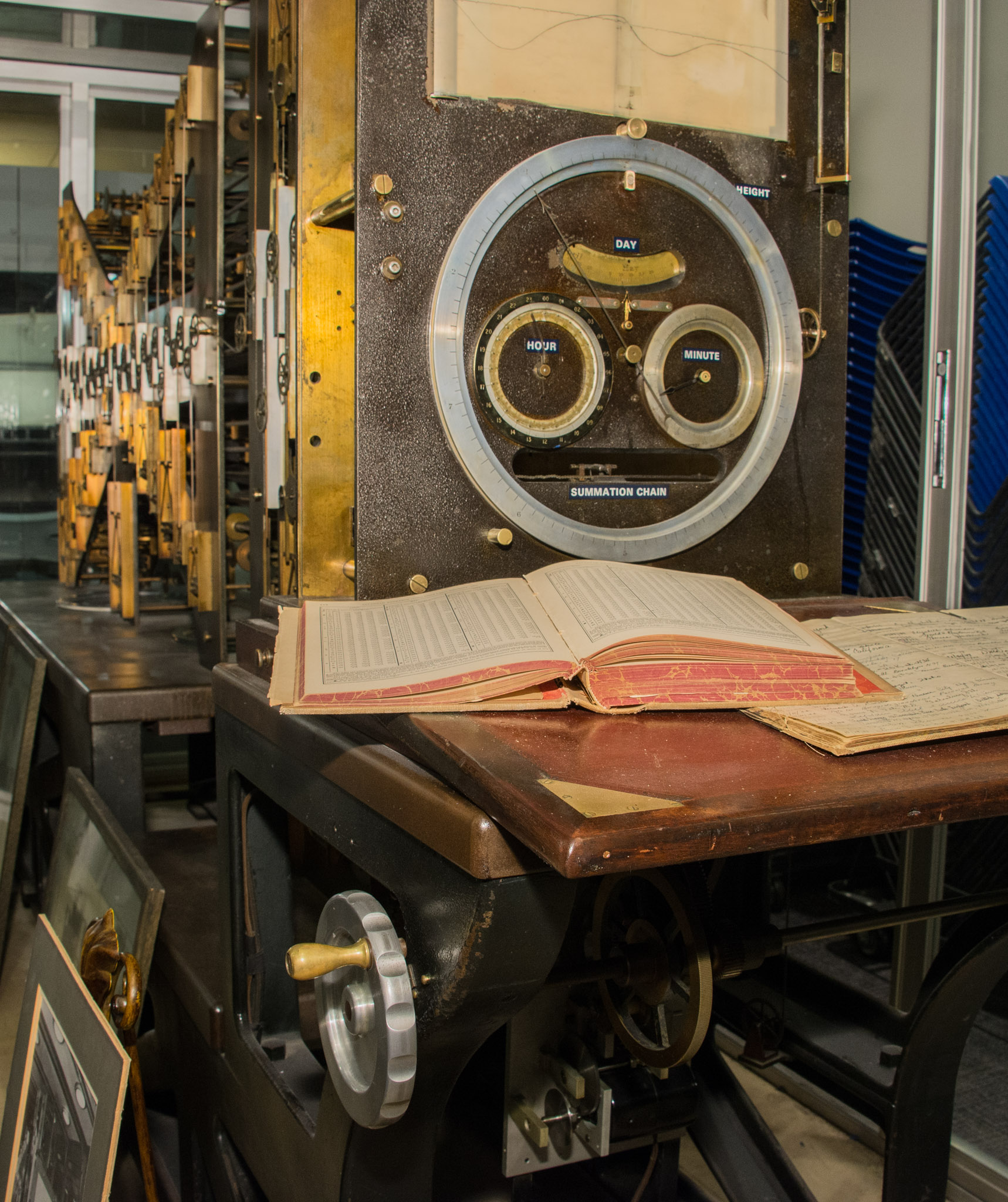
Tide-Predicting Machine No. 2 ("Old Brass Brains"). The operator powered the machine by turning the crank at the left. The machine stopped when the simulation reached high and low tides, at which time the operator recorded the tide height and the day and time from the dials on the machine's face. The tide curve drawn on the paper above the dials was retained in case questions were raised later about the calculations.

=== US Tide Predicting Machine No. 2 ===
US Tide Predicting Machine No. 2 ("Old Brass Brains") was designed in the 1890s by Rollin Harris, built in the United States Coast and Geodetic Survey, completed and brought into service in 1912, used for several decades including during the second World War, and retired in 1965.

=== 20th century ===
Tide-predicting machines were built in Germany during World War I, and again in the period 1935–1938.

Brass machines based on Thomson's original tide machine are credited for the accurate tide predictions in the build-up to the 1944 "D-Day" Normandy landings of World War II.

Three of the last to be built were:

- a Tide Predicting Machine built in 1947 for the Norwegian Hydrographic Service by Chadburn of Liverpool, and designed to compute 30 tidal harmonic constituents; used until 1975 to compute official Norwegian Tide Tables, before being superseded by digital computing.
- the Doodson-Légé TPM built in 1949,
- an East German TPM built 1953–1955.

Excluding small portable machines, a total of 33 tide-predicting machines are known to have been built, of which 2 have been destroyed and 4 are presently lost.

== Display and demonstration ==
Historical tide-predicting machines can be seen in:

- London – William Thompson's first complete tide-predicting machine, at the Science Museum, South Kensington
- Liverpool – the Roberts-Légé and Doodson-Légé machines are exhibited Tide and Time exhibition at the Proudman Oceanographic Laboratory
- Washington
- Silver Spring, Maryland – the second US tide-predicting machine, "Old Brass Brains", at the NOAA offices
- Munich, Germany

== See also ==
- Tide clock
- Tide table
- Tide-Predicting Machine No. 2

== Bibliography ==
- Deutsches Museum, Munich. "2nd German tide-predicting machine" (described in English).
- Ehret, T. (June 2008). "Old Brass Brains - Mechanical Prediction of Tides" (PDF). ACSM Bulletin: 41–44.
- Ferrel, W. (1883). "Appendix 10: A maxima and minima tide-predicting machine". US Coast Survey. pp. 253–272.
- Ferrel, William (4 April 1884). "The Maxima and Minima Tide-Predicting Machine". Science. 3 (61): 408–410. doi:10.1126/science.ns-3.61.408.
- Fischer, E. G. (1912). "The Coast and Geodetic Survey Tide Predicting Machine No. 2". Popular Astronomy. Vol. 20. pp. 269–285.
- German Maritime Museum. "Die Vorausberechnung der Gezeiten" [The forecast of the tides] (in German).
- Norwegian Hydrographic Service Norway. "Historical waterlevel observations". Norwegian Mapping Authority. Archived from the original on 2010-04-25.
- "[minutes of minutes of discussion after presentation of tide machines]". Proceedings. 65. London: Institution of Civil Engineers: 25–64. 1881.
- National Oceanography Centre (2026). "Presenting the Doodson-Légé and the Roberts-Légé Tide Predicting Machines". National Museums Liverpool.
- Parker, Bruce (September 2011). "The tide predictions for D-Day" (PDF). Physics Today. 64 (9): 35–40. Bibcode:2011PhT....64i..35P. doi:10.1063/PT.3.1257.
- Phillips, Tony (2009). "Fourier Analysis of Ocean Tides, II: .2, showing effect of components at incommensurable frequencies". AMS Feature Column Archive. American Mathematical Society.
- Roberts, Edward (31 December 1879). "A new Tide-predicter". Proceedings of the Royal Society. 29: 198–201.
- Thomson, W. (1881). "The tide gauge, tidal harmonic analyser, and tide predicter". Proceedings of the Institution of Civil Engineers. 65: 3–24.
- US Department of Commerce (1915). Description of the US Coast and Geodetic Survey Tide-Predicting Machine No.2 (Report). Special Publication No.32.
- Woodworth, P. L. (2016). An inventory of tide prediction machines (Report). National Oceanography Centre Research and Consultancy Report No. 56.
