= Joseph Proudman =

British mathematician and oceanographer

- Born: 30 December 1888
- Died: 26 June 1975 (aged 86)
- Education: University of Liverpool; Trinity College, Cambridge
- Known for: Taylor–Proudman theorem
- Awards: Fellow of the Royal Society; Adams Prize (1922); Alexander Agassiz Medal (1946)
- Scientific career
- Workplaces: University of Cambridge

Joseph Proudman (30 December 1888 – 26 June 1975), CBE, FRS was a distinguished British mathematician and oceanographer of international repute. His theoretical studies into the oceanic tides not only "solved practically all the remaining tidal problems which are soluble within the framework of classical hydrodynamics and analytical mathematics" but laid the basis of a tidal prediction service developed with Arthur Doodson of great international importance.

== Education ==
Proudman was born in the village of Unsworth, near Bury, Lancashire on 30 December 1888. He attended primary schools at Unsworth and Bold and from 1902 to 1907 he was a pupil-teacher at Farnworth primary school. He augmented his secondary schooling by having extra lessons before school officially started in the morning and also by attending evening classes at Widnes Technical School studying art, mathematics and physiography. He was awarded the Tate Technical Science entrance scholarship and entered the University of Liverpool in 1907. He graduated with first class honours in 1910 winning the Hudson prize for geometry and the Derby scholarship. With this and the award of an entrance exhibition, he had a second brilliant undergraduate career, studying pure and applied mathematics at Trinity College, Cambridge where he became a Wrangler with distinction graduating in 1912.

== Career ==
It was his tutor Rev. E. W. Barnes who suggested that Proudman write to Horace Lamb at Manchester for a suitable topic of research. This started him on his studies of the dynamics of tides which was to become his main scientific interest. He returned to Liverpool as a lecturer in 1913, was appointed the first professor of applied mathematics in 1919.

In 1916 Horace Lamb asked Proudman to assist him in preparing a report for the British Association on the state of research on ocean tides. This led Proudman to the idea of founding an institute for research into all aspects of tides. The idea was brought to fruition in 1919 with the financial aid of the Booth brothers, two Liverpool ship-owners. The Liverpool Observatory and Tidal Institute started its work with Proudman as Honorary Director and Arthur Doodson as Secretary and in a few years acquired a national and international reputation for its tidal prediction services as well as for fundamental research. In 1933 he transferred to the chair of oceanography to which he brought a change of emphasis from biological to physical oceanography. He held this post until his retirement in 1954.

It is stated that from 1924 up to the 1950s the institute was responsible for predicting tides for two-thirds of the world. After several changes of name and status the institute (having amalgamated with the Liverpool Observatory in 1929) is now the Proudman Oceanographic Laboratory (see external links below).

Proudman used to say that his partnership with Doodson was so successful, because he liked to do the algebra while Doodson preferred the arithmetic, an understatement of their work which nevertheless indicated their complementary interests. In addition to his work in developing the departments of applied mathematics and oceanography, Proudman took a full part in University administration and acted as Pro-Vice-Chancellor during the war years 1940–46. Quoting the maxim that "the quickest way to get a lot of things done is to do one thing at a time" he was able to go straight to the heart of a problem, whether scientific or administrative, with an intuition which matched his intellectual ability.

== Personal life ==
Proudman married Rubina Ormrod in 1916 and there were two sons and a daughter of their marriage (James, Nancy and Ian). After his first wife died in 1958, Proudman married Beryl Gould in 1961, who survived him. Proudman died on 26 June 1975.

== Awards ==
Proudman was a well-known figure in international scientific circles and acted as Secretary of the International Association of Physical Oceanography (now the International Association for the Physical Sciences of the Oceans) for a number of years before becoming its president in 1951–54. His foreign distinctions included membership of the Norwegian Academy of Science and Letters, and the Alexander Agassiz Medal of the U.S. National Academy of Sciences. The Adams prize of the University of Cambridge was awarded to Proudman in 1923 for an essay on tides, which proved to be a remarkable seed-bed of ideas from which there developed a series of papers, many of them jointly with Doodson, of theoretical and practical importance. He was awarded the CBE in the 1952 Birthday Honours. After his retirement the University of Liverpool conferred on him the honorary LLD degree. He was a fellow of the Royal Society (elected 1925) which awarded him the Hughes Medal in 1957 and he served on many scientific and government committees. (Adapted from the Times obituary 3 July 1975 and the Biographical Memoirs of the Royal Society).

An amplification mechanism of meteotsunamis dilucidated by Proudman in 1929 is now commonly called Proudman resonance.
