= Beauchamp Tower =

English inventor and railway engineer (1845–1904)

- Born: 13 January 1845; Moreton, Essex
- Died: 31 December 1904 (aged 59)
- Engineering career
- Significant advance: Hydrodynamic lubrication

Beauchamp Tower (13 January 1845 – 31 December 1904) was an English inventor and railway engineer who is chiefly known for his discovery of full-film or hydrodynamic lubrication.

== Early life ==
Beauchamp Tower was born the son of Robert Beauchamp Tower, rector of Moreton, Essex and educated at Uppingham School, Rutland. He decided at the age of 16 that he wanted to become an engineer and received early training at the Armstrong Works at Elswick, where he stayed for a few months as a draughtsman after completing his four-year apprenticeship.

== Inventions ==
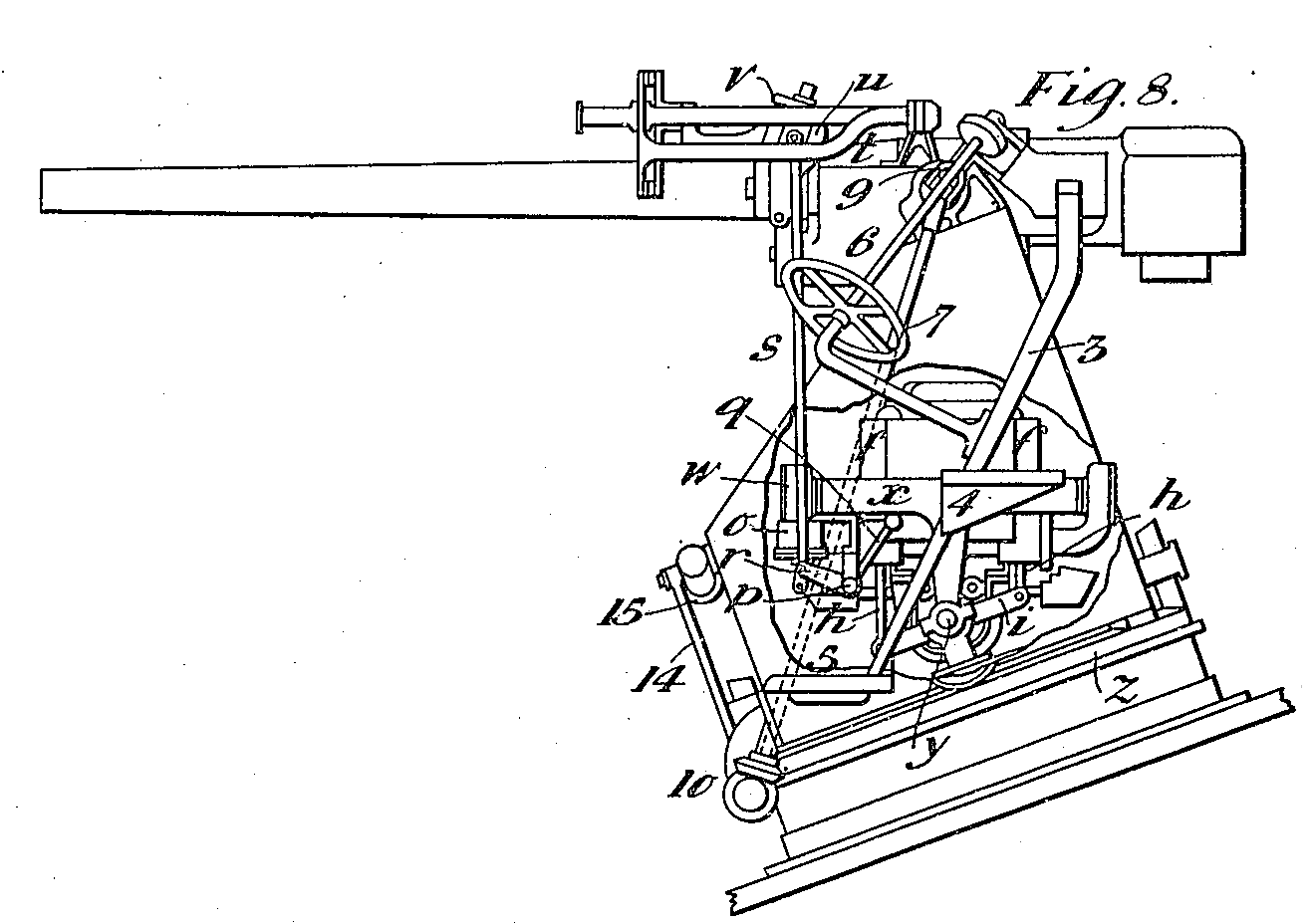
Apparatus for steadying guns on shipboard

Beauchamp Tower held several patents regarding an apparatus for maintaining a constant plane in a floating vessel. The apparatus is based on the gyroscopic principle. One of the possible applications of this patent was steadying guns on shipboard. In 1977, he was named by Duncan Dowson as one of the 23 "Men of Tribology".

== Influence ==
Tower's work on lubrication influenced many other engineers, including Osborne Reynolds, who acknowledged Tower in his 1886 paper on lubrication and the viscosity of olive oil. Lord Kelvin credited Tower with the idea of a chain and pulleys as part of his Tide-predicting machine.
