= Arthur Thomas Doodson =

British oceanographer (1890–1968)

- Born: 31 March 1890; Boothstown Salford, Lancashire
- Died: 10 January 1968 (aged 77); Birkenhead, Merseyside
- Resting place: Flaybrick Memorial Gardens, Birkenhead
- Education: University of Liverpool
- Known for: Doodson numbers;Riccati-Bessel function
- Spouse(s): Margaret Galloway (d.1931>); Elsie May
- Children: 2
- Awards: Fellow of the Royal Society (1933)
- Scientific career
- Fields: Theory of tides
- Thesis: Bessel functions of half integral order. (Riccati-Bessel functions.) (1919)
- Doctoral advisor: Joseph Proudman

Arthur Thomas Doodson (31 March 1890 – 10 January 1968) was a British mathematician and oceanographer, who worked on tidal analysis at Liverpool Observatory and Tidal Institute from 1919 to 1960.

Profoundly deaf, he could not become a teacher and started as meter tester before he obtained his M.Sc.degree at the University of Liverpool, advised by Joseph Proudman. He briefly worked under Karl Pearson first in statistics, then in ballistics calculating shell trajectories until the end of WWI. Joining the newly founded Tidal Institute in Liverpool in 1919 he produced tide tables, and was involved in designing tide-predicting machines. He was elected a Fellow of the Royal Society. During WWII he calculated the best combination of full moon and ideal tidal conditions for D-Day on 6 June 1944. He was involved in work for the International Union of Geodesy and Geophysics.

== Early life and education ==
Arthur Thomas Doodson was born in 1890 at Boothstown, Salford, Lancashire the son of Methodist parents cotton-mill manager Thomas Doodson and Eleanor Pendlebury of Radcliffe, Lancashire. He attended evening classes in mathematics from 1901–1903 to be able to attend Rochdale secondary school. In 1908 he entered the University of Liverpool, Teachers' Training College to become a physics and math teacher. He became profoundly deaf at that time, but graduated with a B.Sc. in both chemistry (1911) and mathematics (1912). He found it difficult to get a job because of his disability, and started with electrical engineering Ferranti in Manchester as a meter tester.

At the same time he enrolled in mathematics at the University of Liverpool. Joseph Proudman was his advisor and gave him the task of diffraction computations evaluating the sums of series of functions related to Bessel functions of half integral order. He created tables of what he called the Riccati-Bessel functions of the sines and cosines and in 1914, he obtained his M.Sc. degree with the tables published by the British Association Committee for Mathematical Tables. From 1914 to 1916 he had a job of semi-research nature in the Testing and Standardizing Department of the Corporation of Manchester.

In 1916, he was appointed to a post in statistics at University College London, under Karl Pearson. There he first used desk calculating machines and solved a problem on the relationship between the mode, median and the mean. However, during WW I Pearson soon had to change his work from statistics to ballistics and Doodson had to work on the calculation of shell trajectories, which he resented as conscientious objector. To calculate the effect of wind on the trajectory of a shot, he modified a method by Ralph Fowler, Herbert William Richmond and Douglas Rayner Hartree, which was later included in the Textbook of AA (anti-aircraft) Gunnery. He became the head of the computing staff and stayed until 1919, when he obtained his D.Sc.

== Career ==
In 1919, he moved back to Liverpool to work on tidal analysis at the newly founded Tidal Institute, which Proudman had persuaded Charles Booth of Liverpool, and Sir Alfred Booth to sponsor. It was housed in the University Physics Building. With a grant, they could hire an assistant computer, a member of Doodson's staff in London, and buy a desk calculator. He analyzed observations of tides at Newlyn. In 1921, Doodson published a major work on tidal analysis. This was the first development of the tide-generating force to be carried out in harmonic form: Doodson distinguished 388 tidal frequencies. Doodson's analysis of 1921 was based on the then-latest lunar theory of Ernest William Brown. In 1923, he produced a first tide table with predictions for 1924, which was used in Liverpool port. He also started to calculate the direction of cotidal lines and created charts. In 1924, he studied the effects of wind and atmospheric pressure on tides. In 1928, he published a paper on tide analysis and a paper on tidal currents from observations in slack water. Doodson devised a practical system for specifying the different harmonic components of the tide-generating potential, the Doodson numbers. He developed the analysis of tidal motions mainly in the oceans, but also in lakes, and was the first to devise methods for shallow water as in estuaries. The thorough analysis at which he excelled became the international standard for the study of tides and the production of tables through the method of determination of Harmonic Elements by Least-Squares Fitting to data observed at each place of interest. That is, by proper association of the astronomical phases, observations made at one time can enable predictions decades away with different astronomical phases.

Doodson used and became involved in the design of tide-predicting machines, of which a widely used example was the "Doodson-Légé TPM". Portugal and Japan ordered a machine in 1923, Brazil in 1927, made by Kelvin, Bottomley & Baird. Only in 1929 the Tidal Institute bought a 1906 A Légé &Co for itself. In 1929, Doodson became the associate director of Liverpool Observatory and Tidal Institute and lived in the Observatory house. In 1933, he built an electronic tide gauge in Birkenhead transmitting over 2 miles into the Observatory. The same year he wrote a paper on earth tides based on seismographic measurements in the Observatory showing a tilt of the earth in during tides.

=== WWII ===
Among other works, Doodson was co-author, with H.D. Warburg of the 1941 "Admiralty Manual of Tides", a textbook of 29 chapters

As the Allies prepared the invasion of Nazi-occupied France, they wanted to land at first light when it was low tide, so hidden obstacles could be seen. Doodson was enlisted to work out the tidal patterns using his mechanised calculators. His calculations revealed that 5–7 June 1944 would provide the best combination of full moon and ideal tidal conditions and D-Day duly took place on 6 June 1944. By 1943, the staff at Liverpool Tidal Institute had been reduced from 15 to Doodson and six young women. They also did "nighttime fire watch on the roof in tin helmets and trench coats and carrying buckets of water in case an incendiary bomb hit the observatory".

=== 1945–1960 ===
In 1945 Doodson became the Director of the Observatory until his retirement in 1960. His work became increasingly international. Starting in 1948 he became involved in work for International Union of Geodesy and Geophysics. In 1954, he was made Chairman of the Finance committee.

In 1948, he also became the Secretary of the International Association of Physical Oceanography (now the International Association for the Physical Sciences of the Oceans), which collected monthly and annual mean values of sea-levels from all countries.

In 1957, he attended a conference by the International Hydrographic Bureau and became involved in the financing and production of bathymetric charts.

== Personal life and death ==
Doodson was part of a breakaway sect of the Plymouth Brethren and conscientious objector. He married twice. In 1919, he married Margaret, daughter of J. W. Galloway, a tramways engineer of Halifax. They had a daughter who later died in 1936, and a son in 1931, but Margret died shortly after giving birth. In 1933, he married Elsie May, daughter of W. A. Carey, who survived him. Doodson died at Birkenhead on 10 January 1968 and was buried at Flaybrick Hill Cemetery.

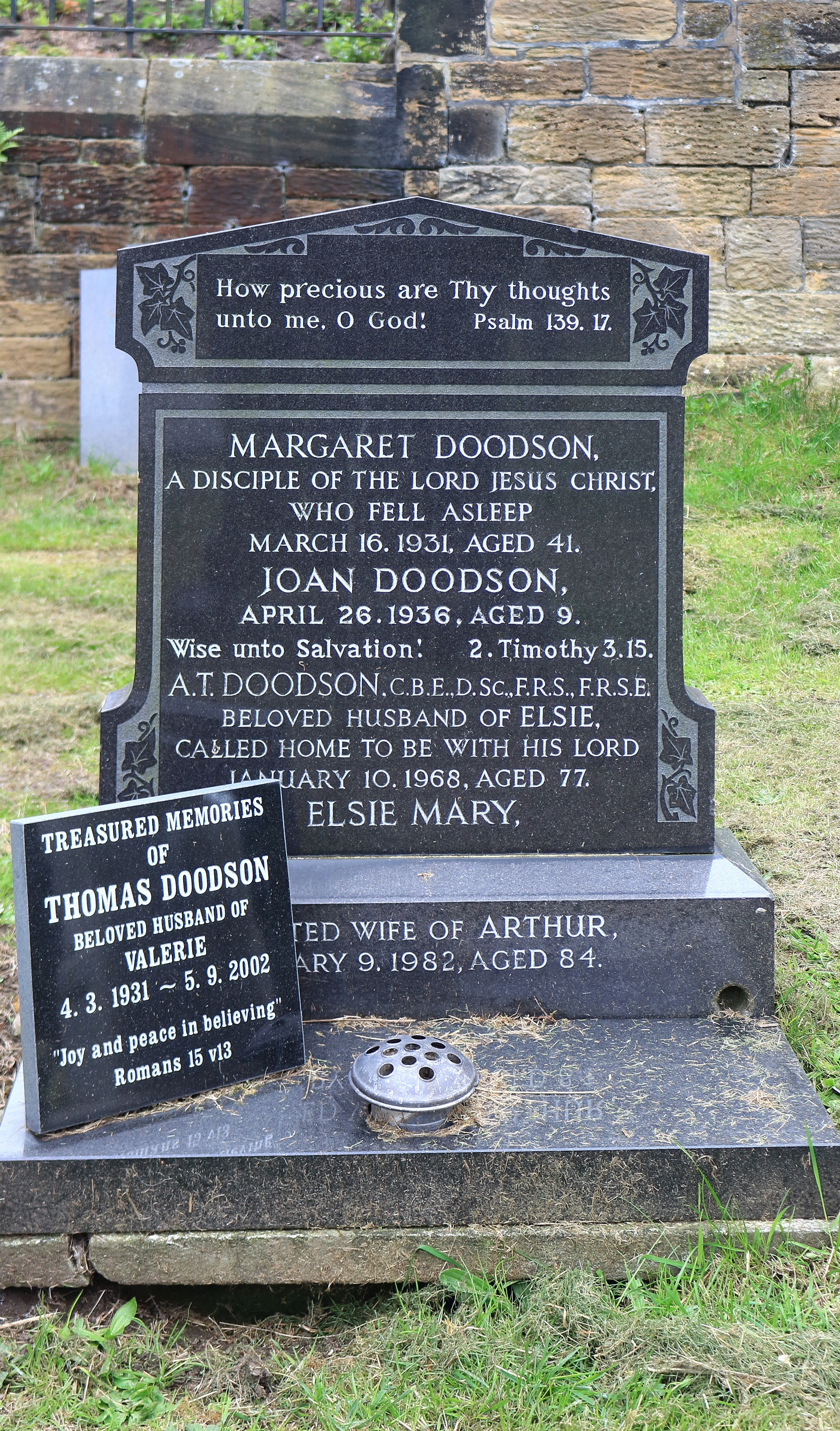
Doodson's grave in Flaybrick Memorial Gardens

Further biographical information is available from the National Oceanography Centre, whose Liverpool facility was formerly the Liverpool Observatory and Tidal Institute, part of the UK Natural Environment Research Council, of which Doodson became director.

== Awards and achievements ==
- In 1912 he won the Ronald Hudson Prize for Geometry.
- In 1930 he won the Thomas Gray Memorial Prize by the Royal Society of Arts for the benefit to navigation.
- In May 1933 he was elected a Fellow of the Royal Society His nomination reads
  Distinguished for his work on tidal theory and on the interpretation of tidal observations, published partly in conjunction with J Proudman, and partly independently, in the Philosophical Transactions, the Royal Society's Proceedings, and elsewhere. Has personally greatly improved the resolution of the astronomical disturbing forces into their more important harmonic constituents. Has carried out the reduction of tidal observations of Antarctic expeditions. Made important contributions to Ballistics during the war, embodying great improvements in calculation, which have since been incorporated in the official Textbook of Anti aircraft gunnery. Has done valuable work in Statistics, and in the computation of mathematical tables.
