= William Ferrel =

American metereologist (1817–1891)

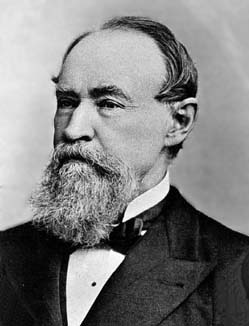
- Born: January 29, 1817; Fulton County, Pennsylvania, US
- Died: September 18, 1891 (aged 74); Wyandotte County, Kansas, US
- Education: Bethany College
- Known for: Ferrel cell
- Notable work: A popular treatise on the winds
- Scientific career
- Fields: meteorology
- Workplaces: American Ephemeris and Nautical Almanac; United States Army Signal Corps; United States Coast and Geodetic Survey

William Ferrel (January 29, 1817 – September 18, 1891) was an American meteorologist who developed theories that explained the mid-latitude atmospheric circulation cell in detail, and it is after him that the Ferrel cell is named.

== Biography ==
Ferrel was born in Fulton county in southern Pennsylvania. He was the eldest of eight children born to his father, Benjamin Ferrel, and his mother, whose first name is unknown. His mother was a farmer's daughter, and his family owned a farm in the Allegheny Mountains on which he was raised. At age twelve, he was working on both the farm and the saw-mill on it. They moved to what would become West Virginia in 1829. His formal elementary schooling was limited and he only attended for two winters, but was inspired by science especially due to witnessing a partial solar eclipse in 1832. Using science books, which he went into Martinsburg and Hagerstown to purchase, he taught himself well enough to become a school teacher.

He saved his salary as a school teacher to attend Marshall College, but could only fund two years of his education. As such, he returned to teaching for two years in West Virginia, to afford the rest of his education at Bethany College. He was able to graduate from Bethany College's first graduating class in 1844. He would continue teaching in Missouri and Tennessee until 1858. In Liberty, Missouri, he found a copy of Newton's Principia which included some additional papers on the tide from the French Academy of Science, which he studied and theorised about. He also studied Laplace's Mécanique Céleste, and these combined led him to believe that the motion of the Sun and moon on the tides was slowing the Earth's rotation around its axis. This was the basis of his first paper, which went against Laplace's theories, as Ferrel believed he had ignored second order terms.

In 1854, Ferrel set up a school in his new home, Nashville, Tennessee. In 1858, he took up a full-time position on the staff of American Ephemeris and Nautical Almanac in Cambridge, Massachusetts. In 1867, he moved to Washington, D.C., and joined the United States Coast Survey

In 1882, Ferrel joined the United States Army Signal Service (which was the United States Government agency responsible for weather forecasting until the creation of the United States Weather Bureau in 1891) and retired in 1886. He died in Maywood (Wyandotte county), a suburb of Kansas City, in 1891.

== Work ==
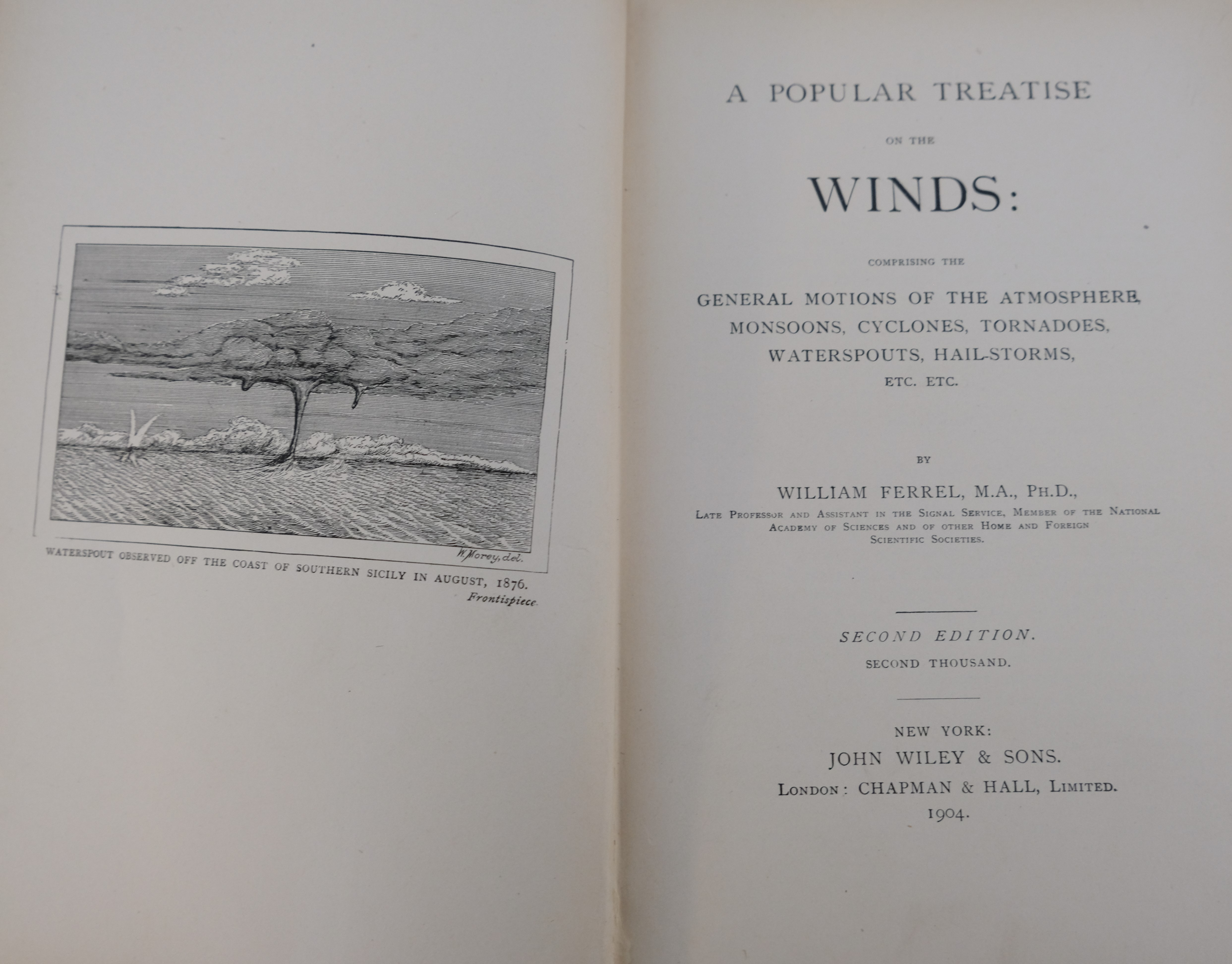
Title page of a 1904 copy of Ferrel's "A popular treatise on the winds: Comprising the general motions of the atmosphere, monsoons, cyclones, tornadoes, waterspouts, hail-storms, etc."

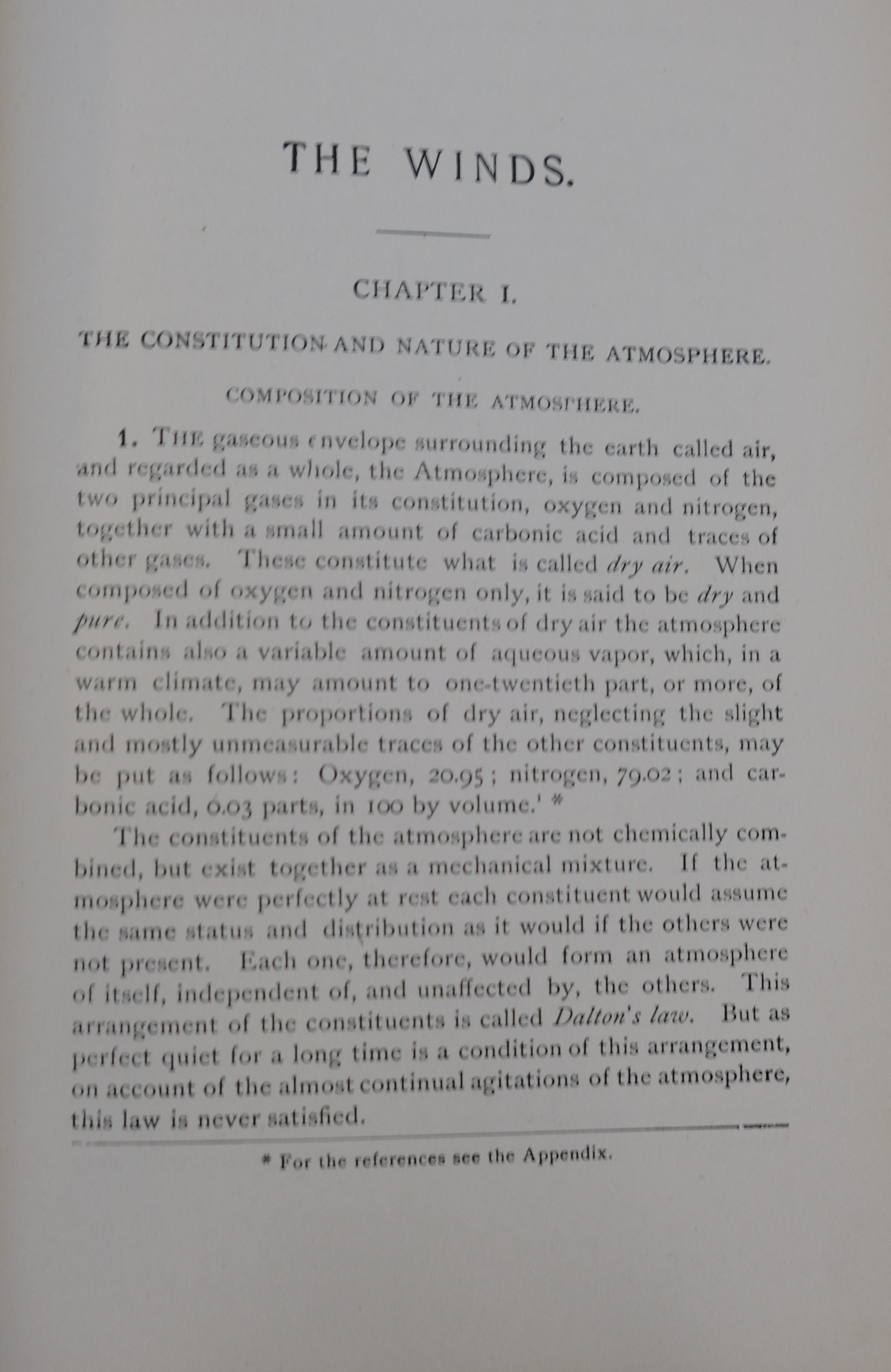
First page of a 1904 copy of William Ferrel's "A popular treatise on the winds: Comprising the general motions of the atmosphere, monsoons, cyclones, tornadoes, waterspouts, hail-storms, etc."

Ferrel demonstrated that it is the tendency of rising warm air, as it rotates due to the Coriolis effect, to pull in air from more equatorial, warmer regions and transport it poleward. It is this rotation which creates the complex curvatures in the frontal systems separating the cooler Arctic/Antarctic air polewards from the warmer tropical air towards the equator.

Ferrel improved upon Hadley's theory by recognizing an until then overlooked mechanism. This is a quote from his first paper:

The fourth and last force arises from the combination of a relative east or west motion of the atmosphere with the rotatory motion of the earth. In consequence of the atmosphere's revolving on a common axis with that of the earth, each particle is impressed with a centrifugal force, which, being resolved into a vertical and a horizontal force, the latter causes it to assume a spheroidal form conforming to the figure of the earth. But, if the rotatory motion of any part of the atmosphere is greater than that of the surface of the earth, or, in other words, if any part of the atmosphere has a relative eastern motion with regard to the earth's surface, this force is increased, and if it has a relative western motion, it is diminished, and this difference gives rise to a disturbing force which prevents the atmosphere being in a state of equilibrium, with a figure conforming to that of the earth's surface, but causes an accumulation of the atmosphere at certain latitudes and a depression at others, and the consequent difference in the pressure of the atmosphere at these latitudes very materially influences its motions.

Hadley's erroneous reasoning had been in terms of a tendency to conserve linear momentum, as air mass travels from north to south or from south to north. Ferrel recognized that in meteorology and oceanography what needs to be taken into account is a tendency, of an air mass that is in motion relative to Earth, to conserve its angular momentum with respect to Earth's axis.

Ferrel also studied the effects that the Sun and Moon had on the tides, and how it affected Earth's rotation about its axis. Laplace had theorised on this before, but he had neglected second order terms and fluid friction. This was through no fault of his own, as the mathematics that would allow him to study it did not exist until the 1840s. It is assumed that friction is proportional to the square of velocity, giving non-linear equations. Ferrel was the first person to treat these successfully. He also suggested that the tides could be explained by the Earth having a viscous interior, and attempted to study the magnetism of the Earth.

Ferrel collected data on the tides, and used this to calculate the mass of the moon. In 1880, he proposed to the Superintendent of the Coast and Geodetic Survey a machine which could use data to predict the tidal maxima and minima. He also presented this idea to the American Association for the Advancement of Science later in the same year. Ferrel resigned from the United States Coast and Geodetic Survey in 1882, but stayed on to oversee the completion of this project, which was a big success and was used for over 25 years.

He also wrote "Vision," an essay discussing his theories on how human sight works; his discussion was based in both mathematics and psychology, and backed up by experiments. Additionally, he wrote about "Variable Stars," discussing how periods of fluctuation could indicate whether they are approaching/retreating the Earth.

== See also ==
- Ferrel's law
- Air mass
- George Hadley
