= Stone sculpture =

Sculpture made from stone

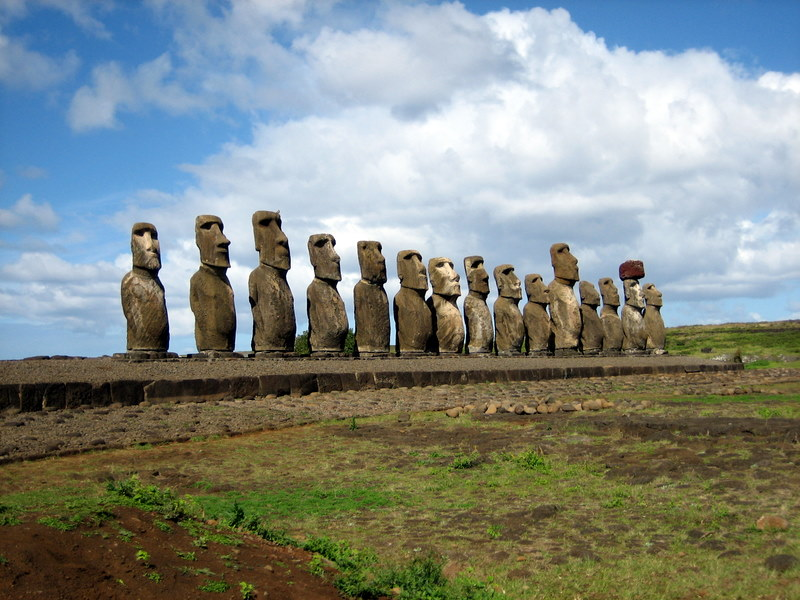
Carved stone human figures, known as Moai, on Easter Island

A stone sculpture is an object made of stone which has been shaped, usually by carving, or assembled to form a visually interesting three-dimensional shape. Stone is more durable than most alternative materials, making it especially important in architectural sculpture on the outside of buildings.

Stone carving includes a number of techniques where pieces of rough natural stone are shaped by the controlled removal of stone. Owing to the permanence of the material, evidence can be found that even the earliest societies indulged in some form of stonework, though not all areas of the world have such abundance of good stone for carving as Egypt, Persia(Iran), Greece, Central America, India and most of Europe. Often, as in Indian sculpture, stone is the only material in which ancient monumental sculpture has survived (along with smaller terracottas), although there was almost certainly more wooden sculpture created at the time.

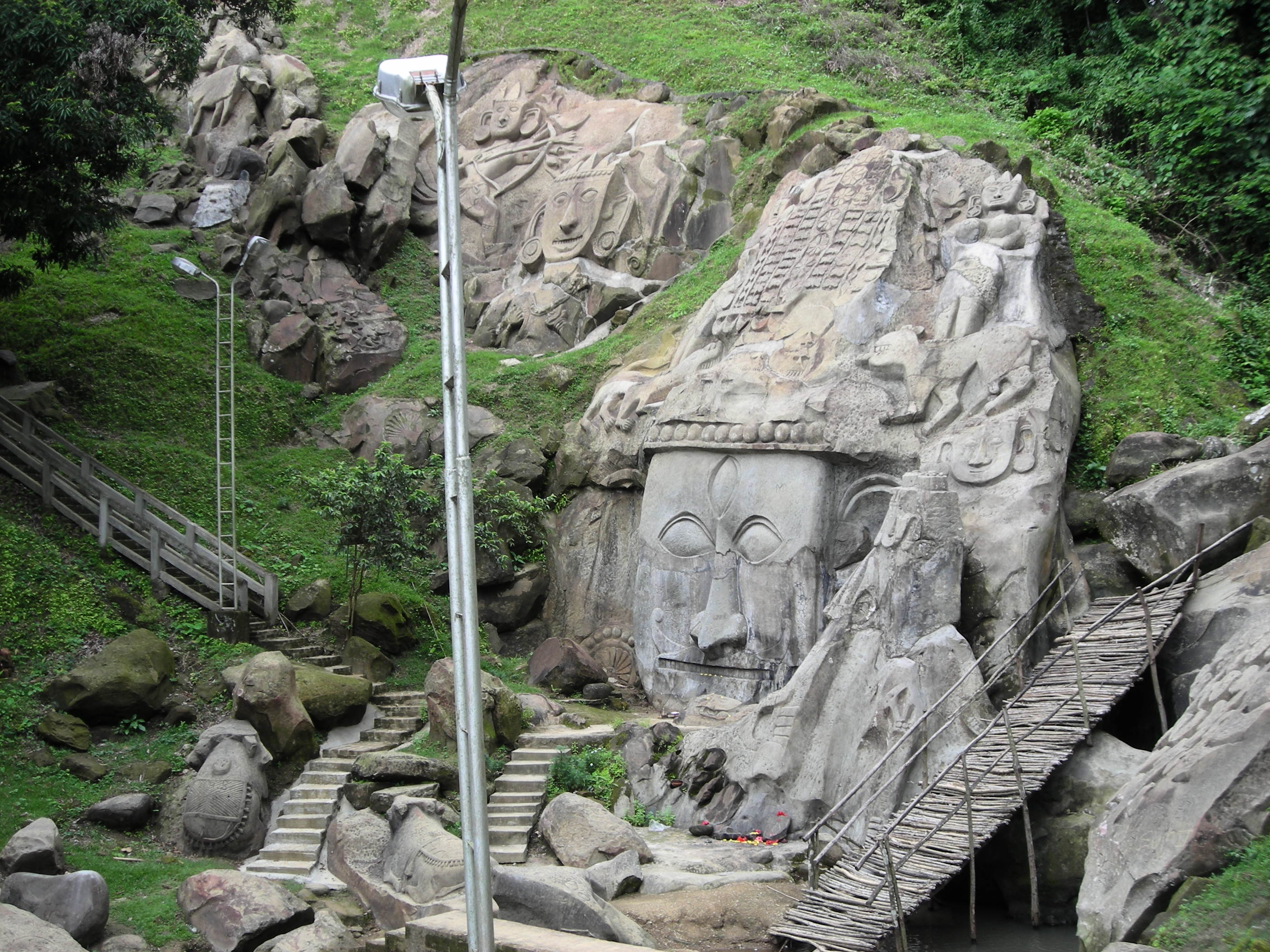
Unakoti group of rock reliefs of Shiva, Tripura, India. 11th century

Petroglyphs (also called rock engravings) are perhaps the earliest form: images created by removing part of a rock surface which remains in situ, by incising, pecking, carving, and abrading. Rock reliefs, carved into "living" rock, are a more advanced stage of this. Monumental sculpture covers large works, and architectural sculpture, which is attached to buildings. Historically, much of these types were painted, usually after a thin coat of plaster was applied. Hardstone carving is the carving for artistic purposes of semi-precious stones such as jade, agate, onyx, rock crystal, sard or carnelian, and a general term for an object made in this way. Alabaster or mineral gypsum is a soft mineral that is easy to carve for smaller works and still relatively durable. Engraved gems are small carved gems, including cameos, originally used as seal rings.

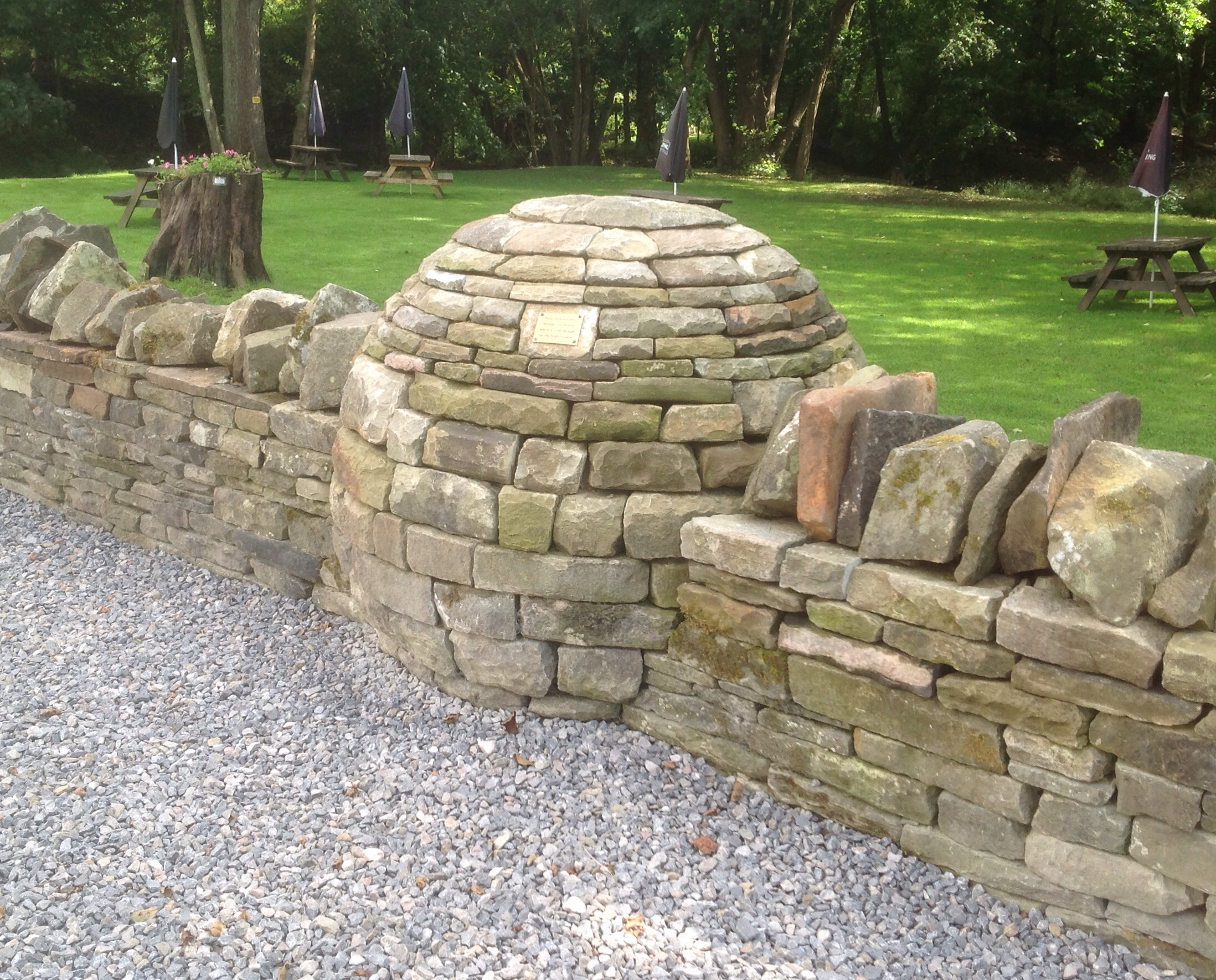
Boundary wall featuring a dry stone sculpture, in the Forest of Dean, Gloucestershire, UK

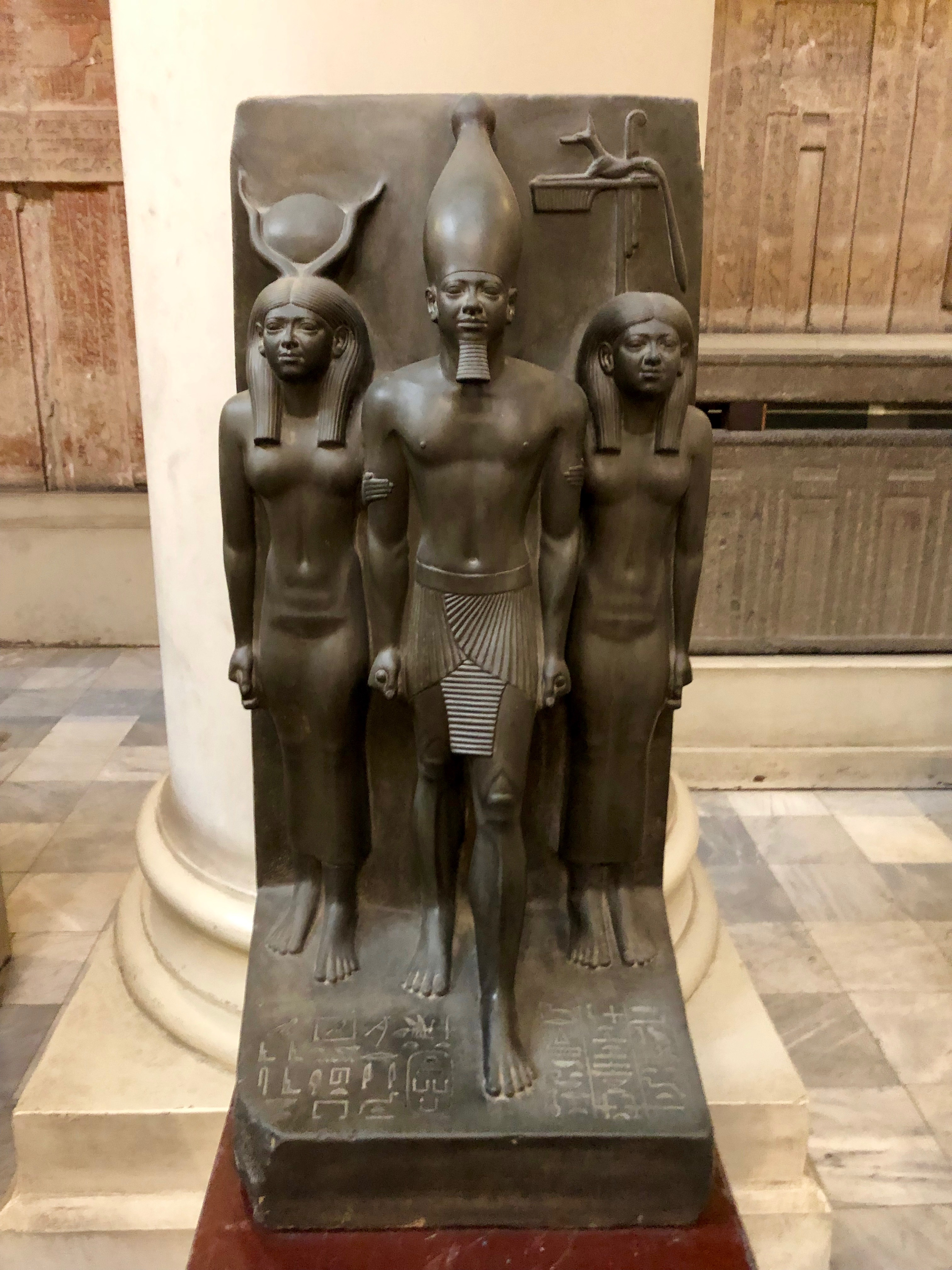
Ancient Egyptian triple portrait in greywacke, a very hard sandstone that takes a fine polish

Carving stone into sculpture is an activity older than civilization itself, beginning perhaps with incised images on cave walls. Prehistoric sculptures were usually human forms, such as the Venus of Willendorf and the faceless statues of the Cycladic cultures of ancient Greece. Later cultures devised animal, human-animal and abstract forms in stone. The earliest cultures used abrasive techniques, and modern technology employs pneumatic hammers and other devices. But for most of human history, sculptors used a hammer and chisel as the basic tools for carving stone.

== Types of stone used in carved sculptures ==
Soapstone, with a Mohs hardness of about 2, is an easily worked stone, commonly used by beginning students of stone carving.

Alabaster and softer kinds of serpentine, all about 3 on the Mohs scale, are more durable than soapstone. Alabaster, in particular, has long been cherished for its translucence.

Verdite, an uncommon variety of serpentine, mostly found in Zimbabwe, can range from dark-greyish to a deep green. It is a 3-4 on the Mohs scale.

Limestone and sandstone, at about 4 on the Mohs scale, are the only sedimentary stones commonly carved. Limestone comes in a popular oolitic variety, about twice as hard as alabaster, that is excellent for carving. The harder serpentines can also reach 4 on the Mohs scale.

Volcanic rock is also used. It's around a 5-6 on the Mohs hardness scale.

Marble, travertine, and onyx are at about 6 on the Mohs scale. Marble has been the preferred stone for sculptors in the European tradition ever since the time of classical Greece. It is available in a wide variety of colors, from white through pink and red to grey and black.

The hardest stone frequently carved is granite, at about 8 on the Mohs scale. It is the most durable of sculptural stones and, correspondingly, an extremely difficult stone to work.

Basalt columns, being even harder than the granite, are less frequently carved. This stone takes on a beautiful black appearance when polished.

== Rough and unfinished statues ==
Rough block forms of unfinished statuary are known and are in museums. Notable are the Akhenaten, Amarna Period statuary found at Akhetaten. One known sculptor, Thutmose (sculptor), has his entire shop excavated at Akhetaten, with many unfinished block forms.

== The process of stone sculpture ==
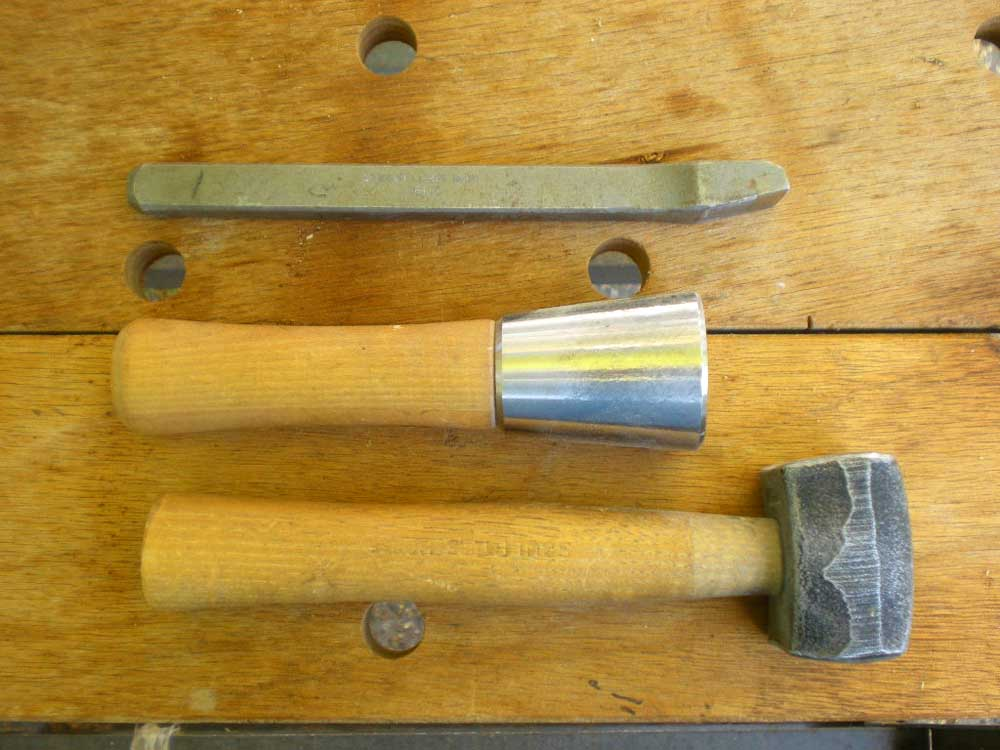
different mallets and pitching tool

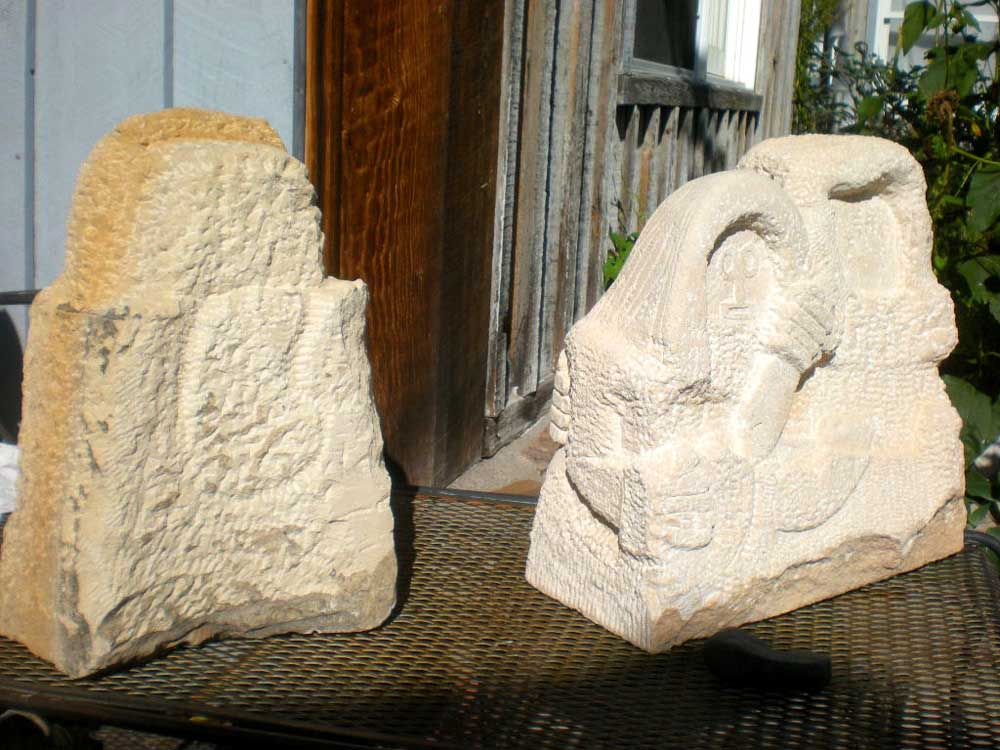
Roughed out carvings

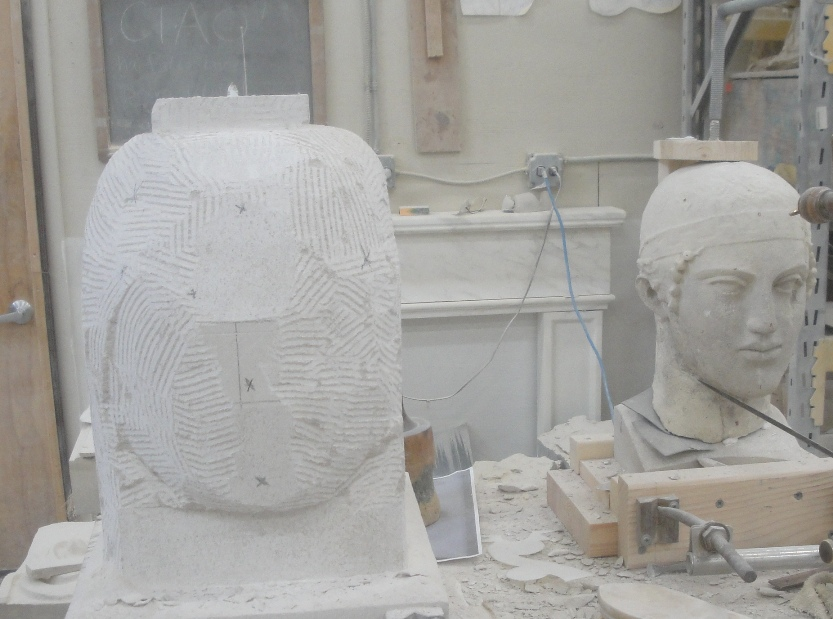
This shows the process of "pointing", the traditional method of making exact copies in stone carving. A point machine is used to measure points on the original sculpture (seen on the right) and transfer those points onto the stone copy (left). Here we see the very early stages, where points have been measured and marked on the stone copy. These markings point out the high points of the surface so that the stone carver knows which surfaces to sink and which to leave alone.

In the direct method of stone carving, the work usually begins with the selection of stone for carving, the qualities of which will influence the artist's choices in the design process. The artist using the direct method may use sketches but eschews the use of a physical model. The fully dimensional form or figure is created for the first time in the stone itself, as the artist removes material, sketches on the block of stone, and develops the work along the way.

On the other hand, is the indirect method, when the sculptor begins with a clearly defined model to be copied in stone. The models, usually made of plaster or modeling clay, may be fully the size of the intended sculpture and fully detailed. Once the model is complete, a suitable stone must be found to fit the intended design. The model is then copied in stone by measuring with calipers or a pointing machine. This method is frequently used when the carving is done by other sculptors, such as artisans or employees of the sculptor.

Some artists use the stone itself as inspiration; the Renaissance artist Michelangelo claimed that his job was to free the human form hidden inside the block.

=== Copying by "pointing" ===
The copying of an original statue in stone, which was very important for Ancient Greek statues, which are nearly all known from copies, was traditionally achieved by "pointing", along with more freehand methods. Pointing involved setting up a grid of string squares on a wooden frame surrounding the original, and then measuring the position on the grid and the distance between grid and statue of a series of individual points, and then using this information to carve into the block from which the copy is made. Robert Manuel Cook notes that Ancient Greek copyists seem to have used many fewer points than some later ones, and copies often vary considerably in the composition as well as the finish.

=== Roughing out ===
When he or she is ready to carve, the carver usually begins by knocking off, or "pitching", large portions of unwanted stone. For this task, he may select a point chisel, which is a long, hefty piece of steel with a point at one end and a broad striking surface at the other. A pitching tool may also be used at this early stage; which is a wedge-shaped chisel with a broad, flat edge. The pitching tool is useful for splitting the stone and removing large, unwanted chunks. The sculptor also selects a mallet, which is often a hammer with a broad, barrel-shaped head. The carver places the point of the chisel or the edge of the pitching tool against a selected part of the stone, then swings the mallet at it with a controlled stroke. He must be careful to strike the end of the tool accurately; the smallest miscalculation can damage the stone, not to mention the sculptor’s hand. When the mallet connects to the tool, energy is transferred along the tool, shattering the stone. Most sculptors work rhythmically, turning the tool with each blow so that the stone is removed quickly and evenly. This is the “roughing out” stage of the sculpting process.

=== Refining ===
Once the general shape of the statue has been determined, the sculptor uses other tools to refine the figure. A toothed chisel or claw chisel has multiple gouging surfaces which create parallel lines in the stone. These tools are generally used to add texture to the figure. An artist might mark out specific lines by using calipers to measure an area of stone to be addressed and marking the removal area with pencil, charcoal or chalk. The stone carver generally uses a shallower stroke at this point in the process.

=== Final stages ===
Eventually, the sculptor has changed the stone from a rough block into the general shape of the finished statue. Tools called rasps and rifflers are then used to enhance the shape into its final form. A rasp is a flat, steel tool with a coarse surface. The sculptor uses broad, sweeping strokes to remove excess stone as small chips or dust. A riffler is a smaller variation of the rasp, which can be used to create details such as folds of clothing or locks of hair.

The final stage of the carving process is polishing. Sandpaper can be used as a first step in the polishing process or sand cloth. Emery, a stone that is harder and rougher than the sculpture media, is also used in the finishing process. This abrading, or wearing away, brings out the colour of the stone, reveals patterns in the surface and adds a sheen. Tin and iron oxides are often used to give the stone a highly reflective exterior. Today, modern stone sculptors use diamond abrasives to sand in the final finishing processes. This can be achieved by hand pads in rough to fine abrasives ranging from 36 grit to 3000 grit. Also, diamond pads mounted on water-cooled rotary air or electric sanders speed the finishing process.

== Contemporary techniques ==
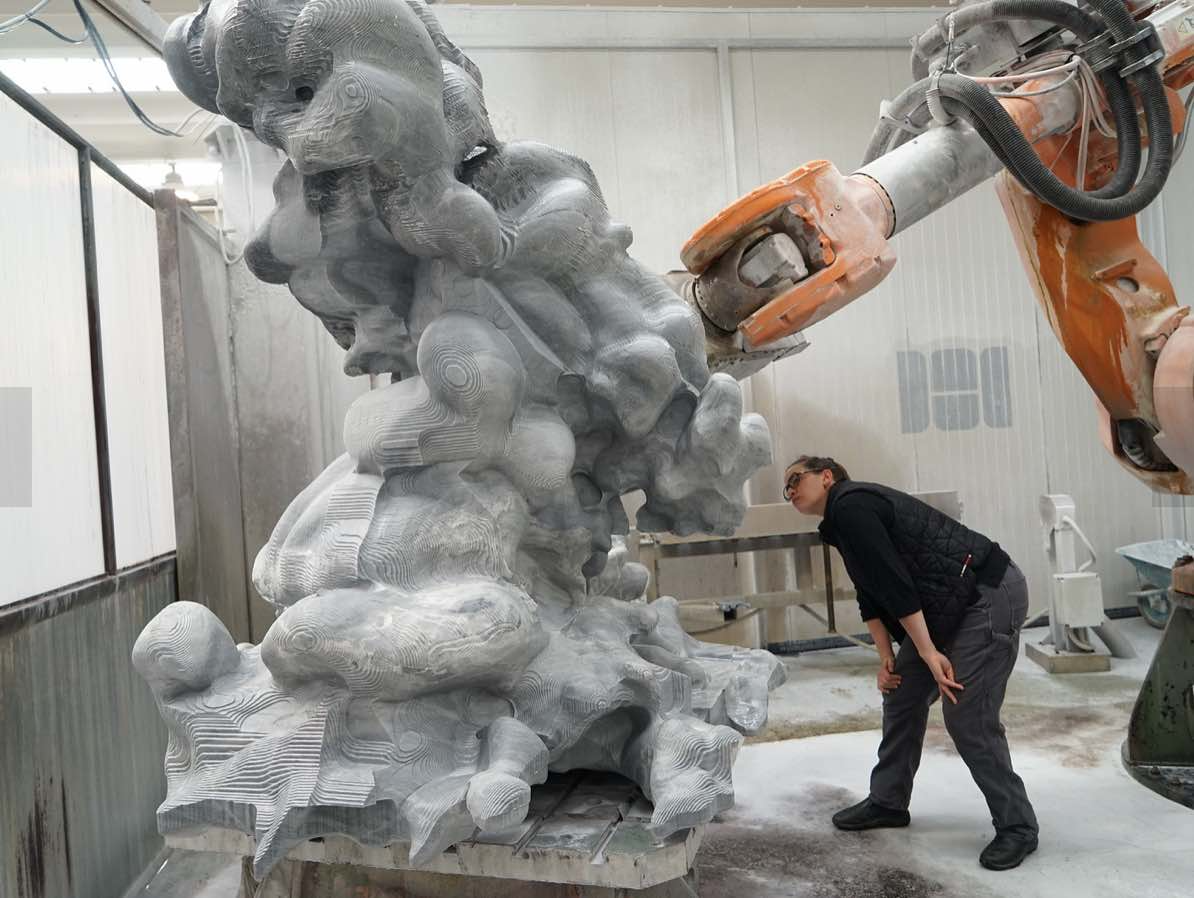
Sculptor Karen LaMonte examines Cumulus, a stone sculpture that she created with the help of weather models, a super computer, and robots.

In the 21st century, stone sculpture has grown to encompass technologically advanced tools including robots, super computers, and algorithms. In 2017, Karen LaMonte first displayed Cumulus, her eight-foot-tall, two-and-a-half ton sculpture of a cumulus cloud carved from Italian marble. To create the work, LaMonte collaborated with California Institute of Technology scientists to model conditions needed to create a cumulus cloud. She then replicated the resulting cloud model in marble using a combination of robot and hand carving. "Rarely does someone just start chipping away in stone," LaMonte told Caltech magazine. "Think about Michelangelo; he submerged his wax model of David in water, exposing it layer by layer and carving the marble to match the emerging figure. Three hundred years later, Antonio Canova perfected the pointing machine to transfer exact points from a model onto marble, followed by Benjamin Cheverton's patented 3-D pantograph. Only by using technology could I make the diaphanous solid and the intangible permanent." The sculpture required four weeks of robot-driven carving, followed by four weeks of hand-finishing, to complete.

== Contemporary Movements ==
=== Zimbabwe Stone Sculpture ===
==== History ====
Thomas Mukarobgwa taught the first director of the National Gallery, Frank McEwen, the customs and beliefs of the Shona people which provided the grounds for the early workshop school that eventually turned into a modern successful Zimbabwe stone sculpture movement.

==== Exhibitions ====
Timeless Spirit in Stone was an exhibit showcased contemporary Zimbabwean stone sculpture. It was held in the Barbara Ackerman Gallery in Santa Monica, California from December 1st, 1992 to March 1st 1993. The artists involved were Joram Mariga, Nicholas Mukomberanwa, Henry Munyaradzi, Bernard Matemera, John Takawira, and Lazarus Takawira. Brighton Sango, Agnes Nyanhongo, and Norbert Shamuy.

== Gallery ==
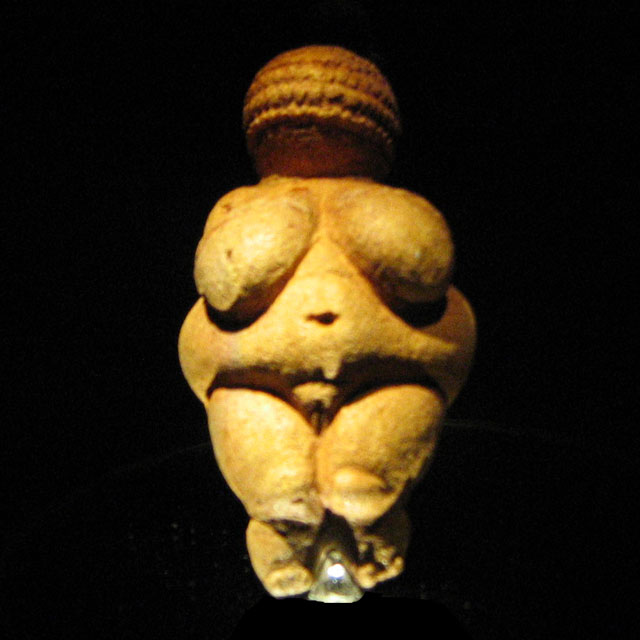
Venus of Willendorf.

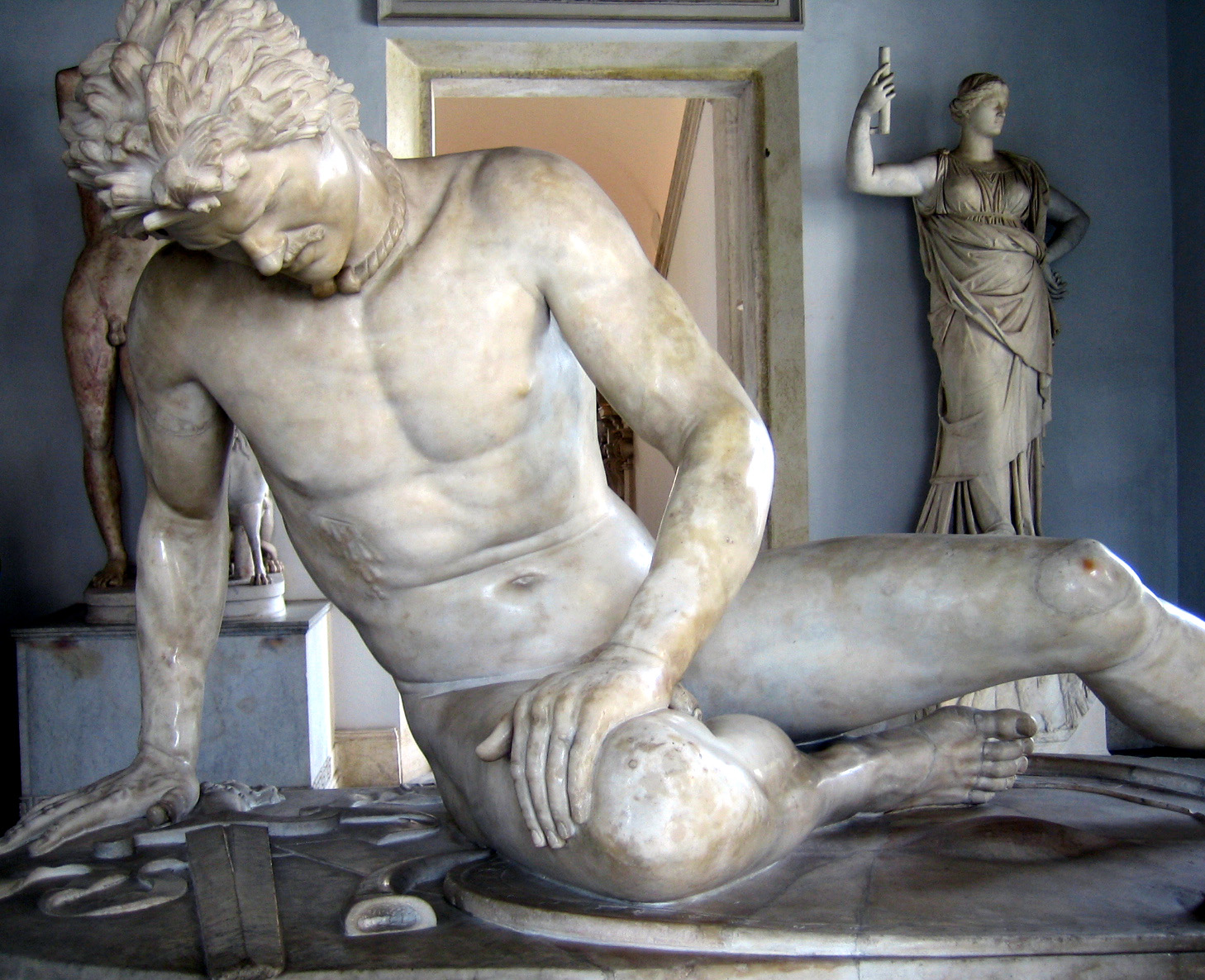
"The Dying Gaul", a Roman marble copy of a Hellenistic work, originally in bronze, of the late 3rd century BCE Capitoline Museums, Rome

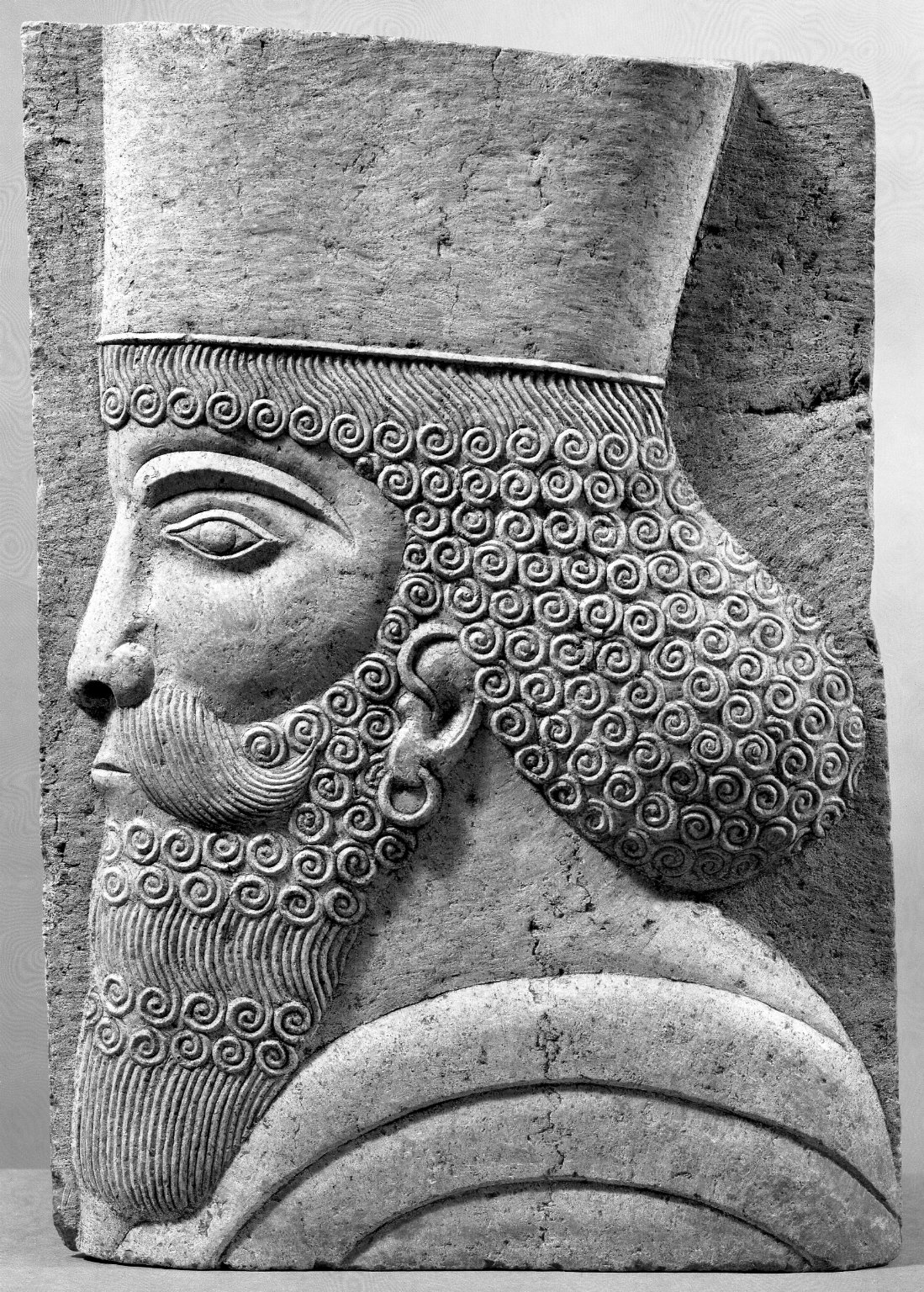
Bas-Relief, late 19th century. Limestone. Brooklyn Museum.

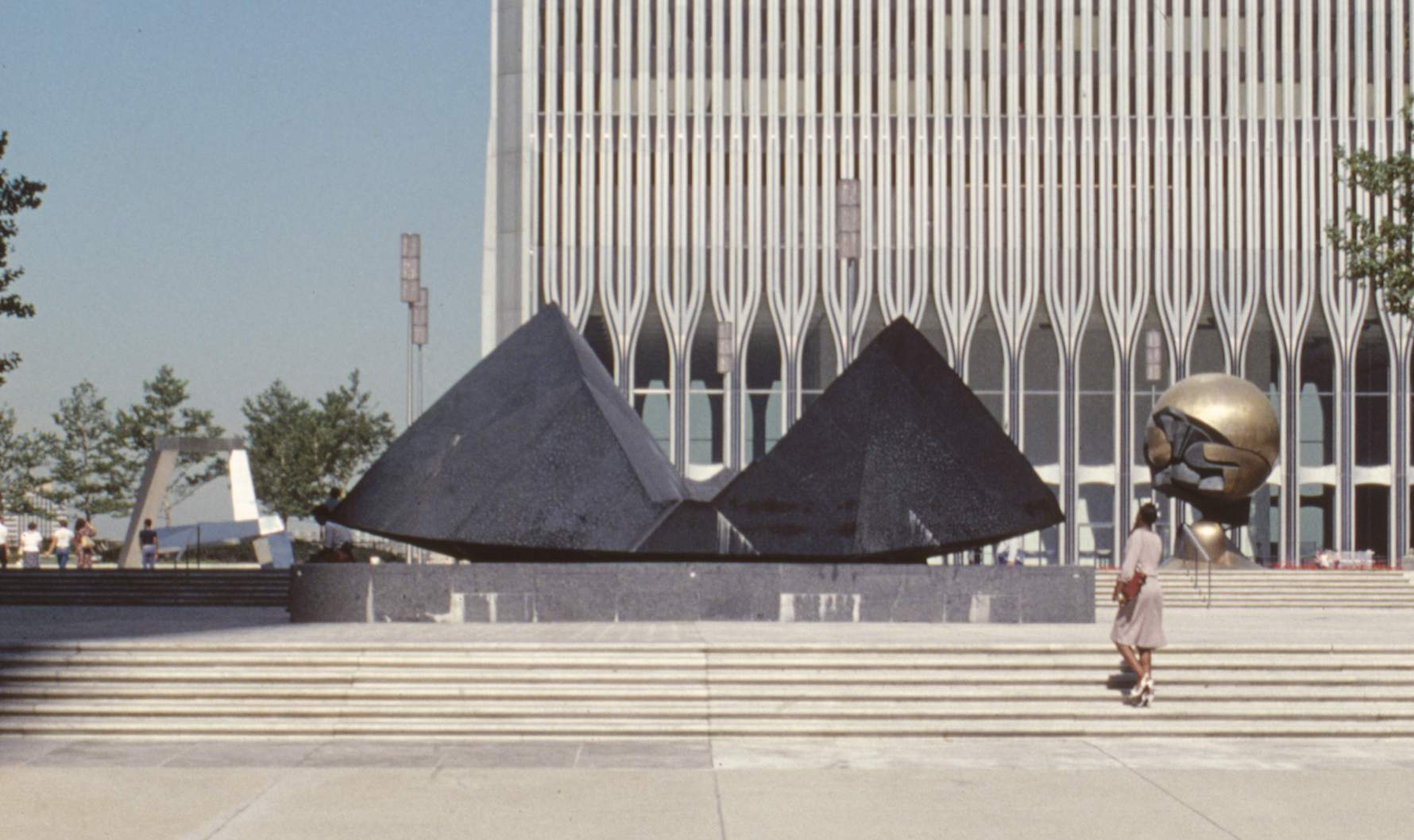
World Trade Center Plaza Sculpture. 1972-2001. Masayuki Nagare. World Trade Center

== See also ==
- Marble sculpture
- Stone carving
- Sculpture
- List of decorative stones
- List of colossal sculptures in situ
- Rock-cut architecture
