= Laura Berman (artist) =

American printmaker

Laura Crehuet Berman
- Born: 1973 (age 52–53); Spain
- Education: New York State College of Ceramics at Alfred University, Tulane University
- Notable work: History of Communication, Part Three; Field; Longevity
- Movement: Printmaking, Monoprinting
- Website: www.lauracrehuetberman.com

Laura Crehuet Berman (Born 1973, Barcelona, Spain) is an American and Spanish artist and printmaker based in Kansas City. Much of her work consists of abstract multicolored monoprints that show recurrent forms overlapping to produce fields of shapes and hues. Her works are in the permanent collections of the Nelson-Atkins Museum of Art in Kansas City in 2001, the Rhode Island School of Design Museum in 2012, and the Spencer Museum of Art at the University of Kansas in 2016.

She is a professor of printmaking at Kansas City Art Institute (KCAI).

== Early life and education ==
Berman was born in Barcelona, Spain. She graduated from New York State College of Ceramics at Alfred University in 1995 with a bachelor's degree in fine arts, and from Tulane University with a master's degree in fine arts.

== Career ==
In 2002, Berman began teaching courses in printmaking, papermaking, and screen printing at the Kansas City Art Institute (KCAI). She became a professor of printmaking at KCAI.

== Artistic works and exhibitions ==
The History of Communication, Part Three is soft-ground etching and silkscreen print. Berman completed it in 2001 and it is in the permanent collection of The Nelson Atkins Museum in Kansas City.

All she ever wanted was everything: Laura Berman's rock collection, exhibited in 2009, consists of hand-cut intaglio prints. Each of the prints reproduces a small rock that came from Berman's rock collection. The work as a whole appears as an oval-shape multicolor collage on a white background.

Field is a multicolor monoprint on paper in the collection of the museum of the Rhode Island College of Design. It was subsequently acquired for the collection of the Spencer Museum of Art at the University of Kansas in 2015. The piece consists of multiple oval figures of varying colors, with some of the figures overlapping.

Longevity is a multicolor monoprint that the Spencer Museum acquired in 2019. The piece consists of over 100 parallel lines of various colors.

In May 2014, an exhibit titled Pulsar included multicolor prints of abstract shapes resembling rocks; prints of abstract trapezoidal and triangular shapes; and prints of configurations of rectangles resembling stellar coronae.

In July 2014, the Washington Post said that while monoprints inspired by Kansas landscapes might sound gray, her works "actually are colorful and sometimes airy." Of her 2016 print series Ebb and Flow, the Washington Post said "spiraling compositions simulate motion, providing the lively illusion that the melding colors will continue to slide in and out of alignment as the shapes spin."

In 2022, a 3-fold print by Berman was selected by the Kansas City International Airport to be permanently displayed near the airport's international gates.

=== Additional works ===
Berman's prints also appear in several books, including Printmaking at the Edge, A Survey of Contemporary Printmaking, and Marshall McLuhan's Book of Probes.
