= Monotyping =

Planographic artistic printing process

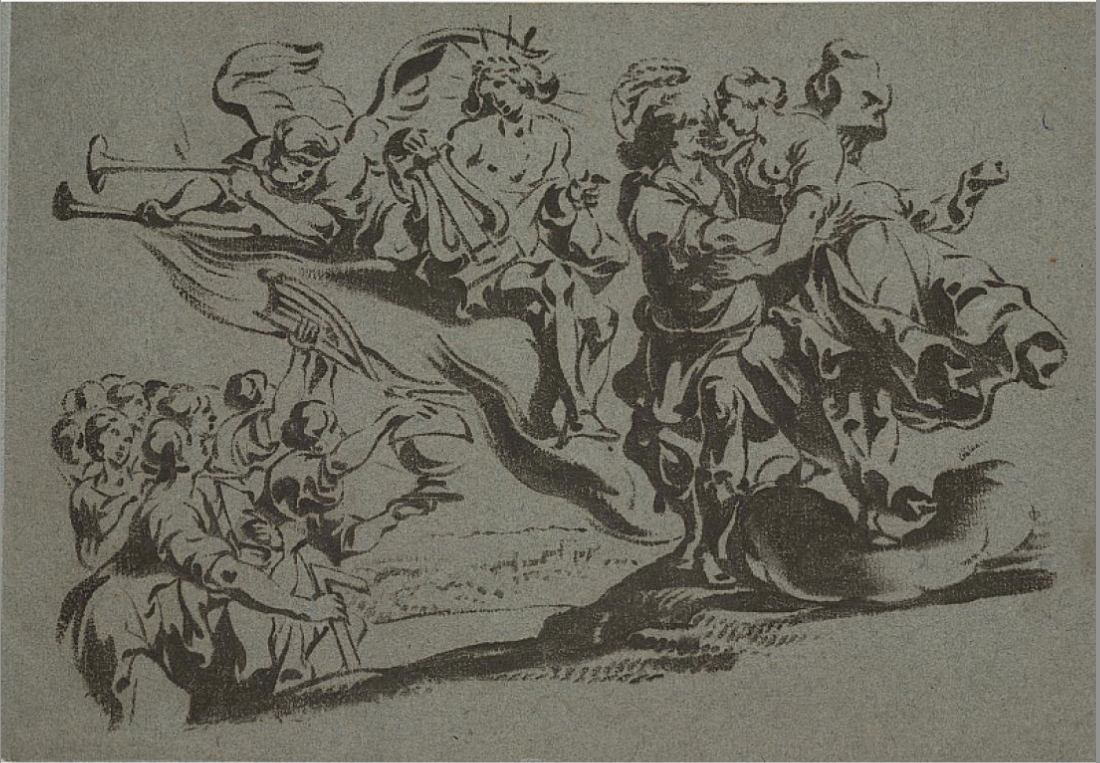
Mythological scene with Apollo, Fame, and the Muses by Antoon Sallaert

Monotyping is a type of printmaking made by drawing or painting on a smooth, non-absorbent surface. The surface, or matrix, was historically a copper etching plate, but in contemporary work it can vary from zinc or glass to acrylic glass. The image is then transferred onto a paper by pressing the two together, using a printing press, brayer, baren or by techniques such as rubbing with the back of a wooden spoon or the fingers which allow pressure to be controlled selectively. Monotypes can also be created by inking an entire surface and then, using brushes or rags, removing ink to create a subtractive image, e.g. creating lights from a field of opaque colour. The inks used may be oil or water-based. With oil-based inks, the paper may be dry, in which case the image has more contrast, or the paper may be damp, in which case the image has a 10 percent greater range of tones.

Monotyping produces a unique print, or monotype; most of the ink is removed during the initial pressing. Although subsequent reprintings (called ghost prints) are sometimes possible, they differ substantially from the original and are generally considered inferior. A print made by pressing a new print onto another surface, effectively making the print into a plate, is called a "cognate". Stencils, watercolour, solvents, brushes, and other tools are often used to embellish a monotype print. Monotypes can be spontaneously executed and with no previous sketch.

== History ==
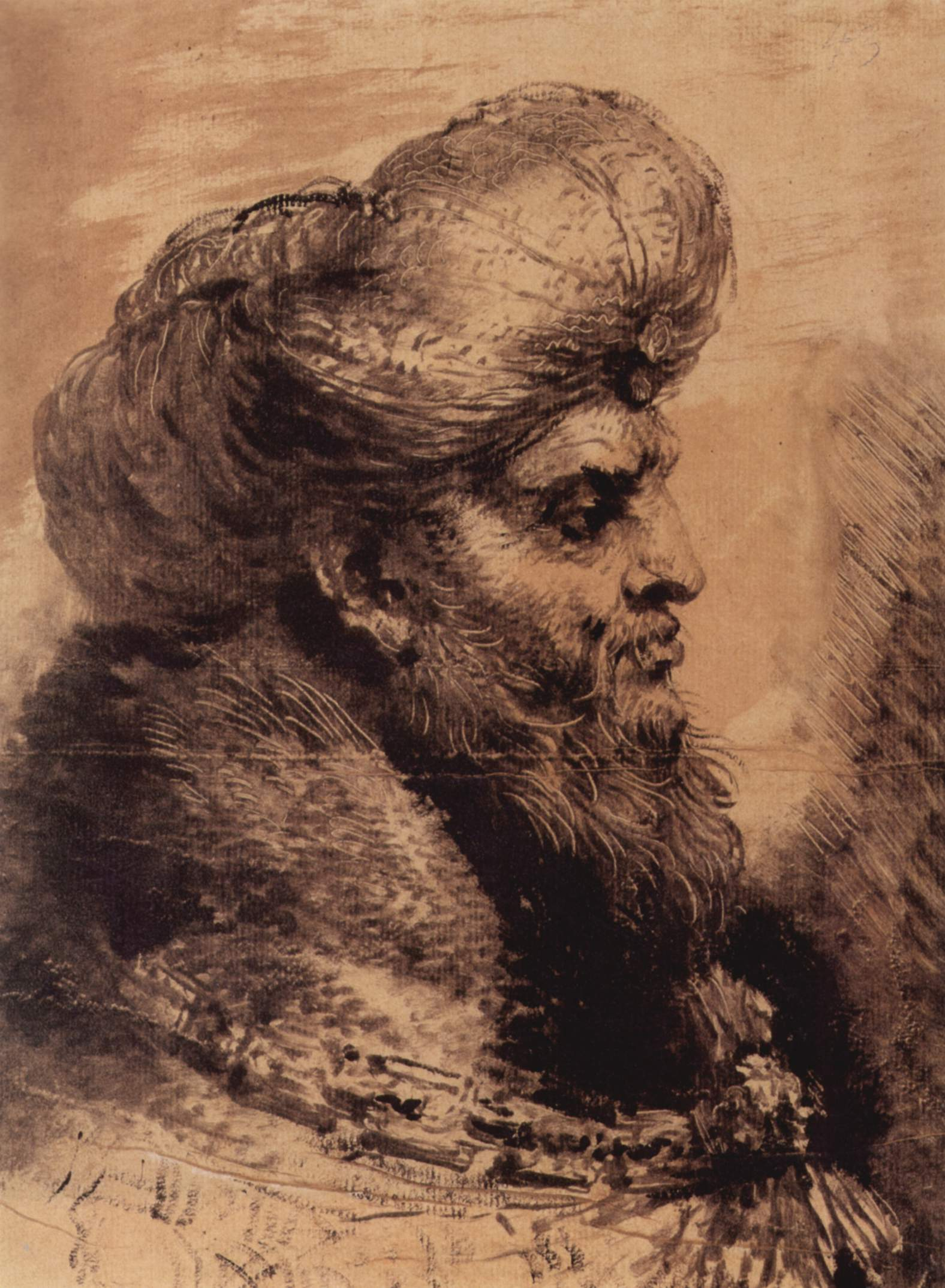
Monotype by Giovanni Benedetto Castiglione, probably a second impression

The identity of the inventor of the monotype process is uncertain. The two leading candidates are the Italian artist Giovanni Benedetto Castiglione and the Flemish artist Antoon Sallaert. Castiglione made brushed sketches intended as finished and final works of art beginning in the mid 1640s. He normally worked from black to white, and produced over twenty surviving monotypes, over half of which are set at night. Sallaert also produced monotypes in the 1640s.

Both Baroque artists used the new technique in different ways. Castiglione created most of his monotypes as black-field images by wiping away ink on a prepared plate thus producing white and grey lines.

Sallaert, on the other hand, brushed bold, tapering lines onto the printing surface with meticulous precision. It is likely that Sallaert's monotype style was influenced by the chiaroscuro woodcuts of the Dutch engraver Hendrick Goltzius. Sallaert found in the monotype a technique which was the closest to drawing and oil sketching. His monotypes and drawings are characterised by swelling lines and tapering ends. He often added by hand white highlights to his monotypes. Sallaert clearly appreciated in the monotype technique the freedom to design on a plate before printing it on paper.

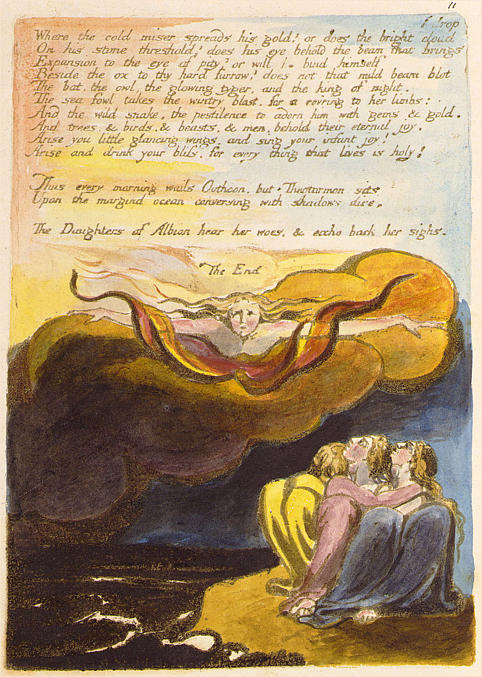
Visions of the Daughters of Albion, a combination by Blake of relief etching for the lines and monotype for the colour

British William Blake developed a different technique, painting on millboard in egg tempera to produce both new works and coloured impressions of his prints and book illustrations, including his Pity. Each impression was usually then worked over by hand, using ink and watercolour. Few other artists used the technique until Degas, who made several, often working on them further after printing (Beside the Sea, 1876-7); Pissarro also made several. Paul Gauguin used a variant technique involving tracing, later taken up by Paul Klee. In the twentieth century the technique became more popular; examples include the extraordinary colorful monotypes created by Marc Chagall in the 1960s. Twenty-first century examples include works by Nicole Eisenman, Christopher Wool, Karen LaMonte, and Roman Turovsky.

== Comparing monotypes to monoprints ==
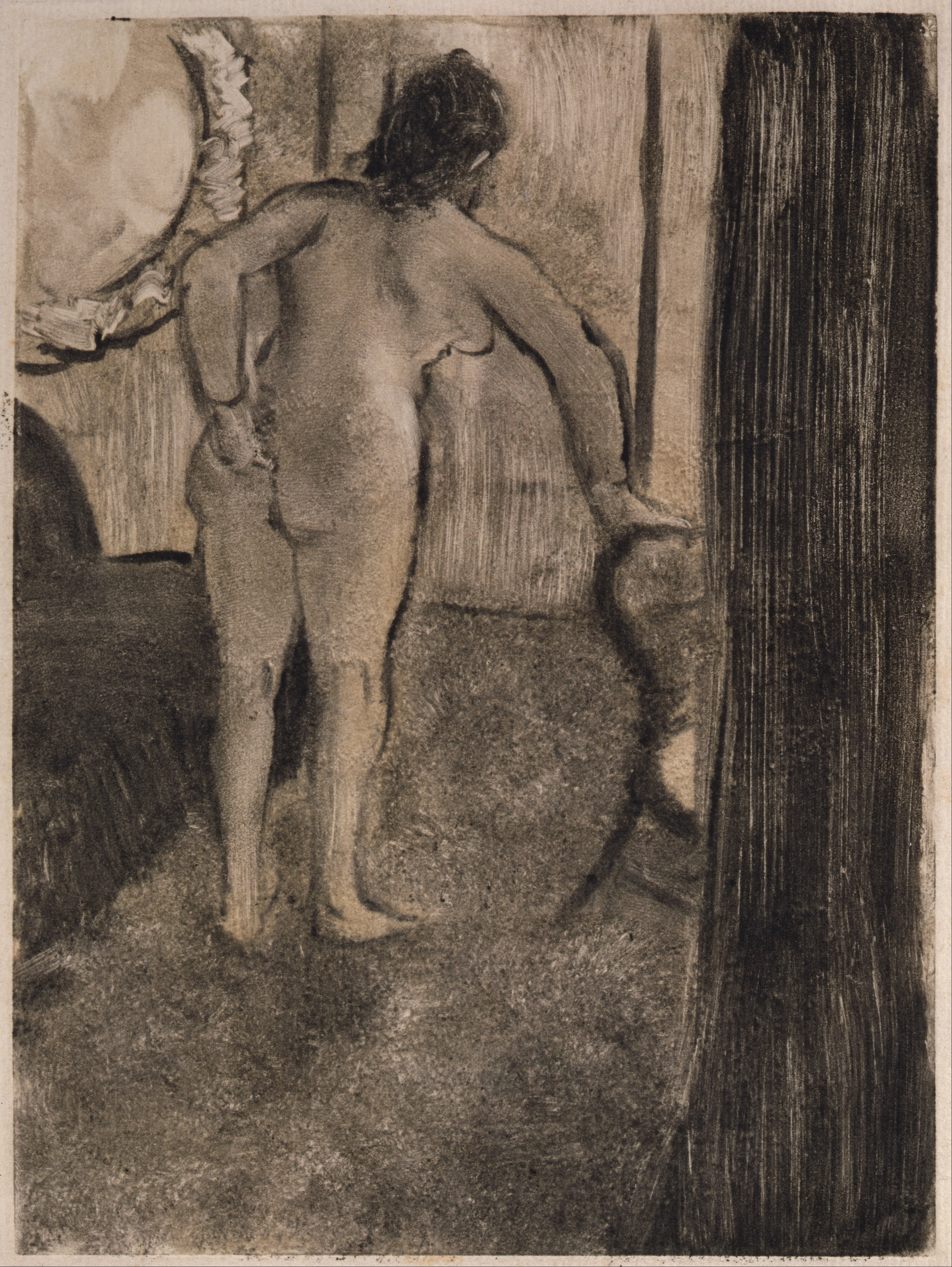
Brothel Scene, Edgar Degas

Historically, the terms monotype and monoprint were often used interchangeably. More recently, however, they have come to refer to two different, though similar, types of printmaking. Both involve the transfer of ink from a plate to the paper, canvas, or other surface that will ultimately hold the work of art. In the case of monotypes, the plate is a featureless plate. It contains no features that will impart any definition to successive prints. The most common feature would be the etched or engraved line on a metal plate. In the absence of any permanent features on the surface of the plate, all articulation of imagery is dependent on one unique inking, resulting in one unique print. Additionally, the term monotype is often used for an image made by inking a non-absorbent surface with a solid colour, laying over it a piece of paper and drawing onto the back of the paper. When the paper is pulled off the resulting print consists of the line surrounded by ink picked up from the inked plate. The result has a chance element, often random and irregular which gives the print a certain charm, a technique famously used by British artist Tracey Emin, a graduate of the Royal College of Art, where the practice of monoprinting in general was regarded as "fake painting".

Monoprints, on the other hand, now refers to the results of plates that have permanent features on them. Monoprints can be thought of as variations on a theme, with the theme resulting from some permanent features being found on the plate—lines, textures—that persist from print to print. Variations are confined to those resulting from how the plate is inked prior to each print. The variations are endless, but certain permanent features on the plate will tend to persist from one print to the next.

== See also ==
- Monoprinting
- Paper marbling

== Sources ==
- Reed, Sue Welsh & Wallace, Richard, Italian Etchers of the Renaissance and Baroque, Museum of Fine Arts, Boston 1989, pp 262–5,ISBN 0-87846-306-2 or 304-4 (pb)
