= Karen LaMonte =

American sculptor of glass and metal dresses

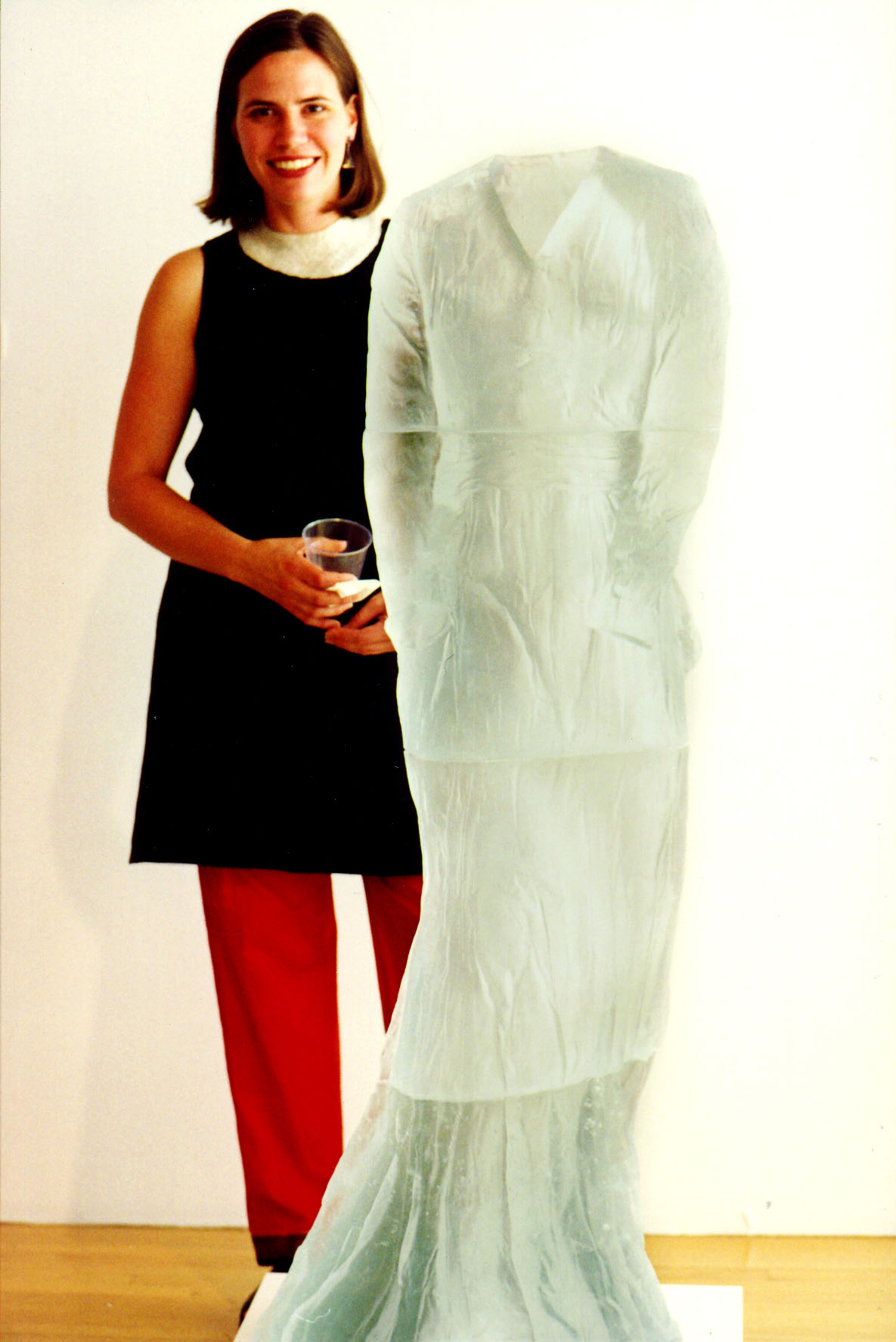
- Karen LaMonte with Vestige in 2001
- Born: December 14, 1967 (age 58); New York, New York, US
- Education: Rhode Island School of Design, Providence, Rhode Island
- Known for: Sculpture, contemporary art
- Website: www.karenlamonte.com

Karen LaMonte (born December 14, 1967) is an American artist known for her life-size sculptures in ceramic, bronze, marble, and cast glass.

== Background ==
LaMonte was born and grew up in Manhattan, New York. In 1990, after she graduated from the Rhode Island School of Design (RISD) with a Bachelor in Fine Arts with honors, LaMonte was awarded a fellowship at the Creative Glass Center of America, in Millville, New Jersey. Following that, she moved to Brooklyn, New York, and worked at UrbanGlass, a not-for-profit public access glass studio. During this period, she pursued artwork in blown and cast glass, pieces of which were exhibited at fine art galleries.

In 1999, LaMonte won a Fulbright scholarship to study at the Academy of Arts, Architecture and Design in Prague, where, in 2000, she created her first major work, Vestige. She soon gained critical acclaim; among the accolades she received were The Louis Comfort Tiffany Foundation Biennial Award in 2001 and the UrbanGlass Award for New Talent in Glass in 2002. In 2006, the Japan-United States Friendship Commission awarded her a seven-month fellowship to study in Kyoto, Japan; this trip inspired her Floating World series of works.

In 2009, LaMonte began a collaboration with the Kohler Artist Center at the Corning Museum of Glass where she was named to the museum's Joint Artist-In-Residence Program. In 2017, the Corning Museum and Corning Inc. appointed her the Specialty Glass Artist-In-Residence at Corning's scientific research laboratory. Several of her works are part of the Corning Museum's permanent collection.

In 2015, LaMonte received the Masters of the Medium award from the James Renwick Alliance. Her works have been exhibited at museums including the Czech Museum of Fine Art in Prague, the Chrysler Museum of Art in Norfolk, Virginia, and the Museum of Glass in Tacoma, Washington. Her works are also included in the permanent collections of The Smithsonian Museum of American Art, Renwick Gallery, Washington DC, The Fine Arts Museums of San Francisco, M. H. de Young Memorial Museum, the Musée des Arts décoratifs, Paris, France, and The National Gallery of Australia, Canberra.

LaMonte lives and works in Prague, Czech Republic, with Steve Polaner, her husband and studio manager.

== Artwork ==
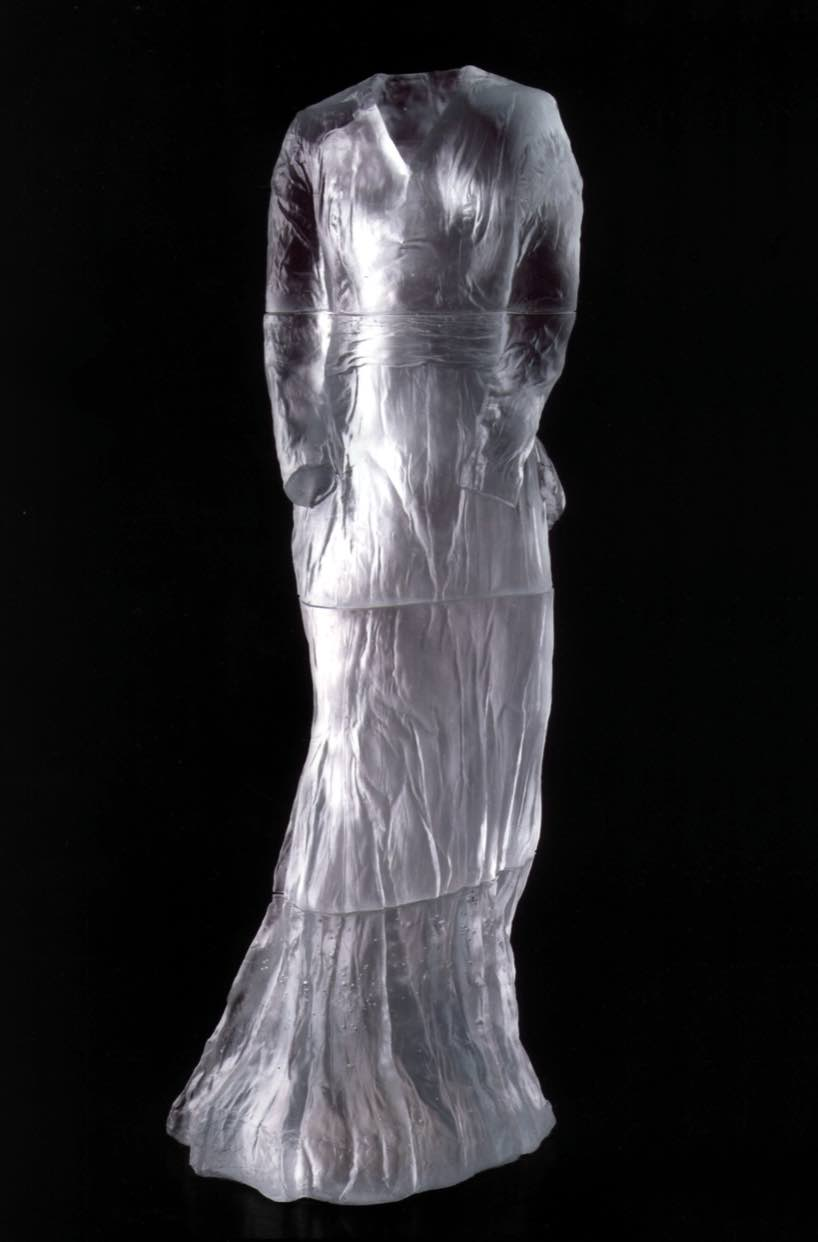
Vestige by LaMonte

During her Fulbright year, LaMonte began to work at glass casting studio in Pelechov, where glass artist Stanislav Libenský and Jaroslava Brychtová also worked. In this studio, she developed Vestige, a cast glass life-size sculpture of a dress with the wearer absent; the work took one year to complete and required the development of special technologies, including the lost wax technique. Vestige would later be seen as a seminal and influential artwork in the field of contemporary art and glass.

LaMonte's art addresses themes of beauty and loss; her works use a sartorial lens to explore the fragility of the human condition.

LaMonte's sculptural work has received critical acclaim from art critics such as Arthur Danto. In his 2005 essay "The Poetry of Meaning and Loss: The Glass Dresses of Karen LaMonte", Danto wrote about Vestige:

The dress belonged to a moment when the wearer was, to use an expression of Proust's, en fleur. The dress belonged to a certain moment of history, which it preserves—it shows how women dressed for certain occasions at a certain moment. The wearer will have aged. She looked like that then, but, if she is still alive, it is certain she will not look that way now. There is a double melancholy—the melancholy of fashion, and the melancholy of bodily change, from nubility to decrepitude. The breasts have fallen, the waist thickened, the skin has lost it transparency and luminescence. The poignancy of LaMonte's dresses is a product of two modes of change in which we participate as human beings, composed, as we are, of flesh and meaning. Their poetry is the poetry of beauty and loss.

During LaMonte's 2006 fellowship to Japan, she explored how clothing serves as a societal language. Her research in Japan focused on the construction and meaning of the traditional kimono, hundreds of which she brought back to her Prague studio. LaMonte then used biometric data from Japanese women to build kimono forms in glass, bronze, rusted iron, and ceramic. Like her previous works, these full-sized kimono sculptures depict only garments and not their wearers. LaMonte entitled this series of sculptures Floating World, a name inspired by both Ukiyo-e woodblock prints and by the storied, arts-themed pleasure quarters of Edo-era Japan.

LaMonte continued her examination of the female form with Nocturnes, a series of works informed by the night-themed paintings of James Abbot McNeill Whistler and by the nocturne musical compositions of John Field and Frederic Chopin. LaMonte built these sculptures from evening gowns of her own design, then cast them in white bronze, rusted iron, and blue glass. By focusing her work on the clothing and not the wearer, LaMonte says, “I subverted the tradition of the Odalisque—the idealized recumbent female nude—by taking away the body.”

In 2013, LaMonte spoke with the Crystal Bridges Museum of American Art about her creative process and research techniques:

The research is definitely part of the appeal, but the thing that comes first is the conceptualization: the idea for the sculptures. That's one layer of research, which I adore. And then usually it takes months and months for the ideas to come together and a vision becomes clear. Then the second phase is realization and that usually entails a bunch of material research and material studies. Definitely if the ideas I'm working with push me into a new material, I'm always thrilled at the challenges, because I do love learning. And I think it's very very healthy to access your creative mind to solve technical problems as well.

In 2017, LaMonte displayed her large-scale sculpture Cumulus at the Glasstress exhibition, in conjunction with the 2017 Venice Biennale. Unlike most of her previous works which focused on the absence of the human body, Cumulus depicts a cumulus cloud. She described her inspiration to Caltech Magazine:

What struck me was the fascinating and completely unexpected weight of clouds. We see them floating in the air. We think of them as fluffy cotton balls, like helium balloons. But when you learn a bit more, you realize they're actually amazingly heavy. I thought, wouldn't it be amazing if we could get a 'real' cloud and carve it in marble?

LaMonte worked with Tapio Schneider, a climate scientist from the California Institute of Technology, to calculate and model the dimensions needed for Cumulus. She used robots to carve a 15-ton block of marble, and then spent four weeks hand-finishing the sculpture. Cumulus shares a common thread with LaMonte's previous garment-focused work. "My cloud is baroque in its physicality," she told Caltech Magazine. "It looks like folds of fabric or flesh tumbling through space."

== Major works ==
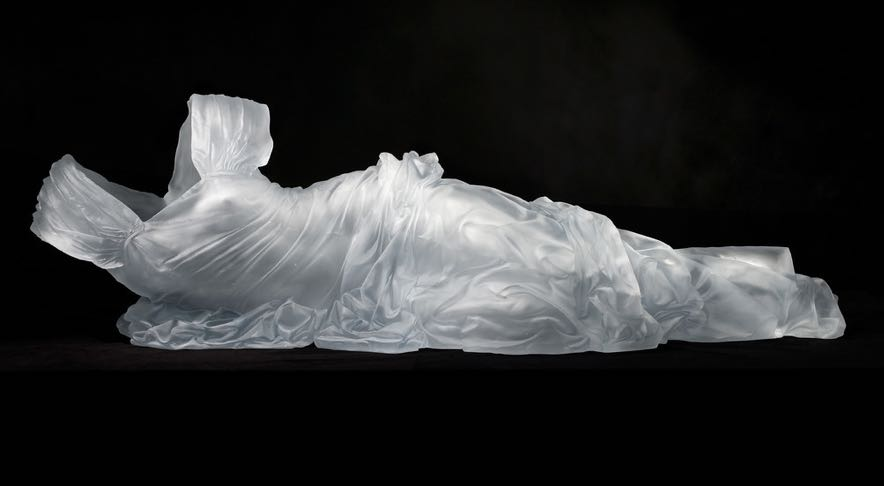
Reclining Dress Impression with Drapery by LaMonte

=== Dress sculptures ===
LaMonte's first dress sculpture, Vestige (2000), is an influential work of cast glass. It was described by Habatat Galleries as a “glass sculpture that changed the course of art history.”

Vestige depicts a life-sized woman's dress, from which the wearer is absent. This sculpture and LaMonte's related works have received international acclaim for their uniqueness and beauty. Her Reclining Dress Impression with Drapery (2009) is part of the Smithsonian American Art Museum and Renwick Gallery’s permanent collection. The de Young Museum in San Francisco’s permanent collection contains Dress 3 (2001).

=== Floating World kimono sculptures ===
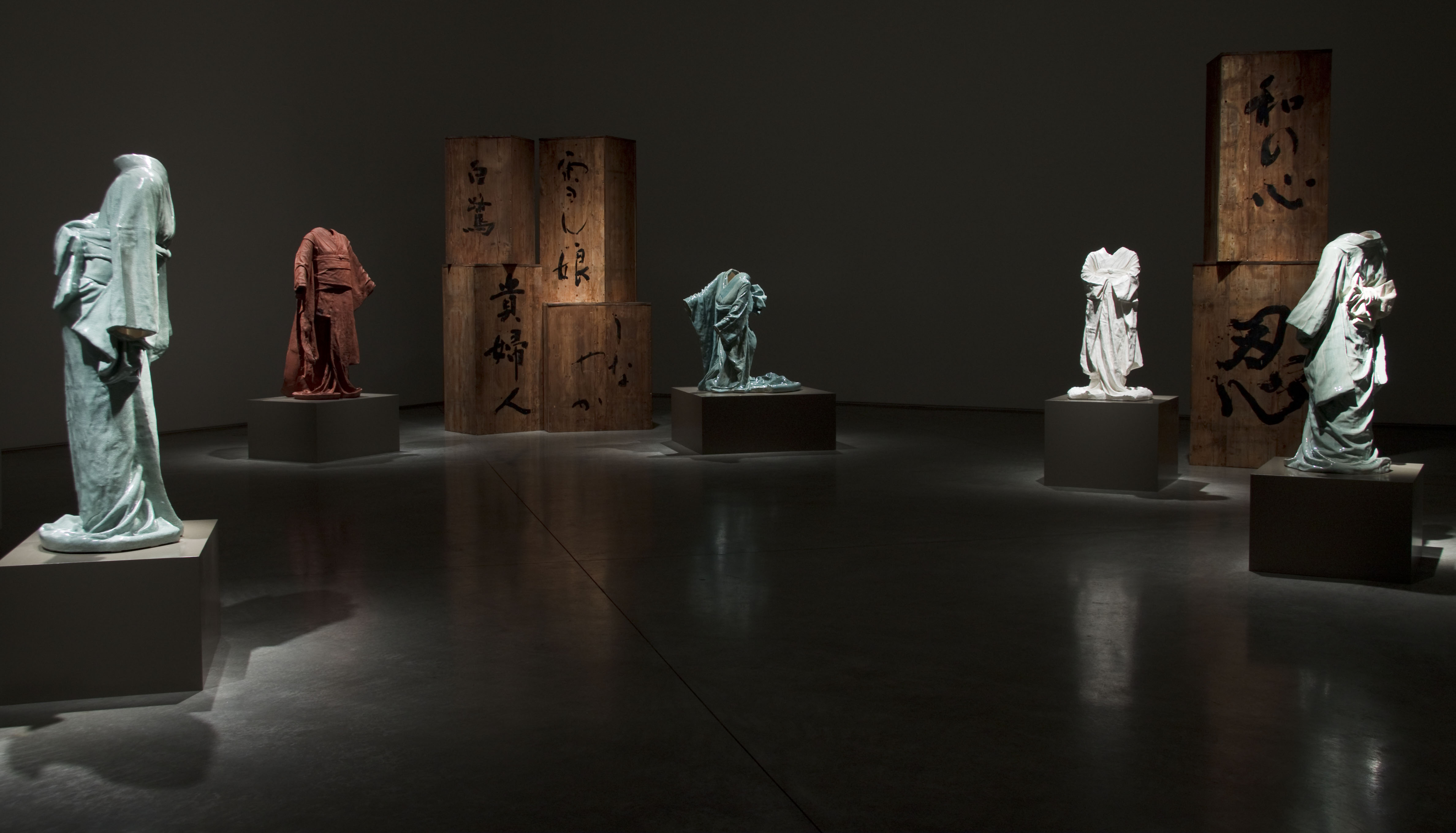
Sculptures from LaMonte's Floating World series

LaMonte's Floating World series evolved from her dress sculptures; these Japan-influenced works depict kimono without their wearers. The sculptures are life-sized and created in iron, cast glass, bronze, and ceramic. Some works in the series also feature elements of kintsugi, a technique which uses gold to repair damaged or broken ceramic.

LaMonte was inspired to create this series during her research fellowship in Kyoto, which was awarded by the Japan-U.S. Friendship Commission. LaMonte writes about living "in the traditional kimono-making district of Nishijin":

Even at night, my neighborhood hummed with the sounds of kimono production. I studied all aspects of the craft, from weaving fabric to drawing imagery. Fortunately, many people devoted to the preservation of traditional methods took me under their wing.... In all cultures, clothing is an unspoken language; but the Kimono is perhaps the most codified.

Sculptures from LaMonte's Floating World are in the permanent collection of many museums, including Maiko (2010) at the Museum of Fine Arts, Boston; Odoriko (2012, bronze), Kabuki (2012, ceramic), and Hanako (2012, cast glass) at the Chazen Museum of Art; and Chado (2010, cast glass) at the Knoxville Museum of Art.

=== Etudes ===
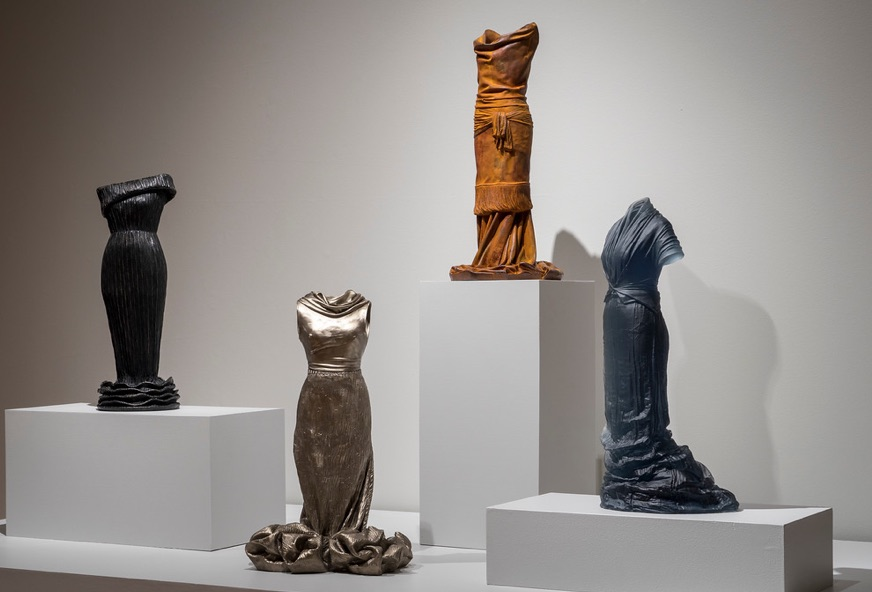
Etudes: one-third scale dress sculptures in white bronze, rusted iron, cast glass, and other materials by LaMonte

LaMonte's Etudes are smaller than the life-sized dress sculptures that first gained her widespread recognition and are crafted from white bronze, rusted iron, cast glass, and other materials. She writes:

I began to develop my one-third-scale models into a stand-alone group of sculptures that I called Etudes, a reference to my inspiration from the field of music from composers such as Frédéric Chopin. The Etudes are much more than studies for larger works. They celebrate the power of human optimism and our enduring need for beauty.

LaMonte's Etudes sculptures are featured in the permanent collections of the Imagine Museum.

=== Nocturnes ===
LaMonte describes her Nocturnes series as "A new body of work inspired by the beauty of night... dark, seductive, and sublime. They are absent of female forms – rising from penumbral garments as figurations of dusk. They build on the tradition of the female nude and probe the tension between humanism and eroticism, the physical and the ethereal, the body and the spirit. The figures are at once intensely physical – muscles and flesh strain against clinging fabric – and yet insubstantial: the figures are absent, implied only by the shapes pressing against the clothing."

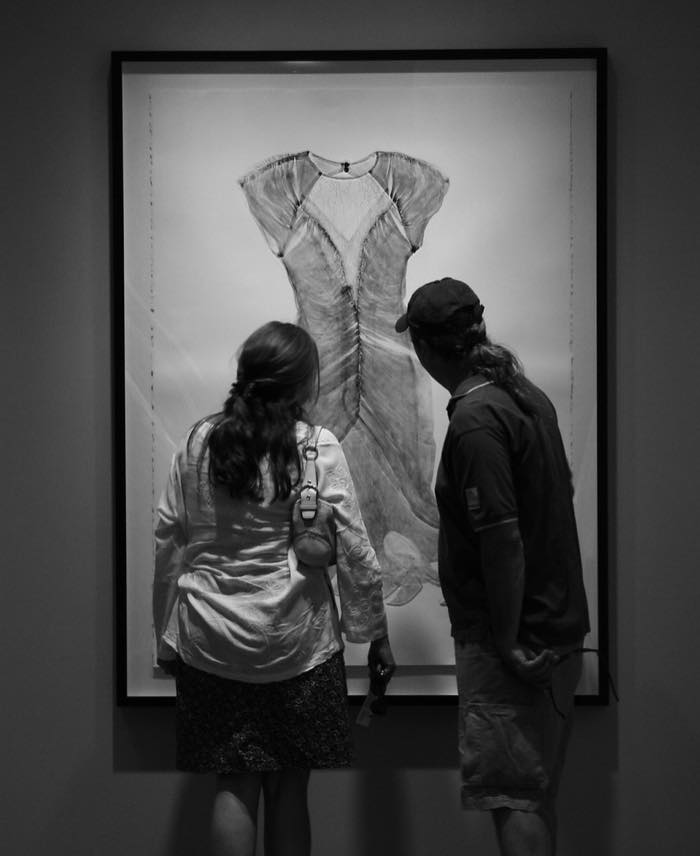
Visitors to the Museum of Glass in Tacoma, Washington look at a Sartoriotype print by LaMonte.

The Nocturnes have been written about extensively, including a monograph published in 2019 with an essay by Dr. Steven Nash, who wrote:

Despite these associations with the past, LaMonte's sculptures are very much of our own time. They take their place in the resurgence of figurative art following Minimalism’s banishment of the human figure in favor of elemental abstract forms, and help underline the importance that sculpture has played in that development. Many contemporary sculptors have adopted the human body as an important vehicle for study of different aspects of the human condition, including Kiki Smith, Jaume Plensa, Thomas Schütte, Huma Bhabha, Juan Muñoz, and Georg Baselitz. LaMonte's contributions in this arena involve both her inventive treatment of materials and form and her investigations of female identity and self-expression, which, as we have seen, strike us in both sensuous and abstract ways. Each sculpture is an individual construction of visual, haptic, and intellectual experience, totally integrated. As the acclaimed British painter Cecily Brown has opined, "Painting is very good at saying more than one thing at once." LaMonte's Nocturnes affirm that sculpture is as well.

Sculptures of the Nocturnes series are in the permanent collections of The Corning Museum, Knoxville Museum of Art, Iowa State University Museums, and Imagine Museum.

=== Sartoriotype prints ===
In addition to her sculpture work, LaMonte creates vivid, graphical, gray-scale monotype prints that depict clothing. "Blind to colour but hypersensitive to texture, the paper on which the monotypes are printed renders an almost X-ray-like image of the garment," wrote Richard Drury in the Sculptures and Sartoriotypes monograph, "a view through the layers of fabric - and through the tissue of time, to when the ripples and crumples we see in the prints were created by the active limbs of a unique human experience. It is an experience portrayed somehow fleetingly, an apparition of reanimated identity."

=== Cumulus ===
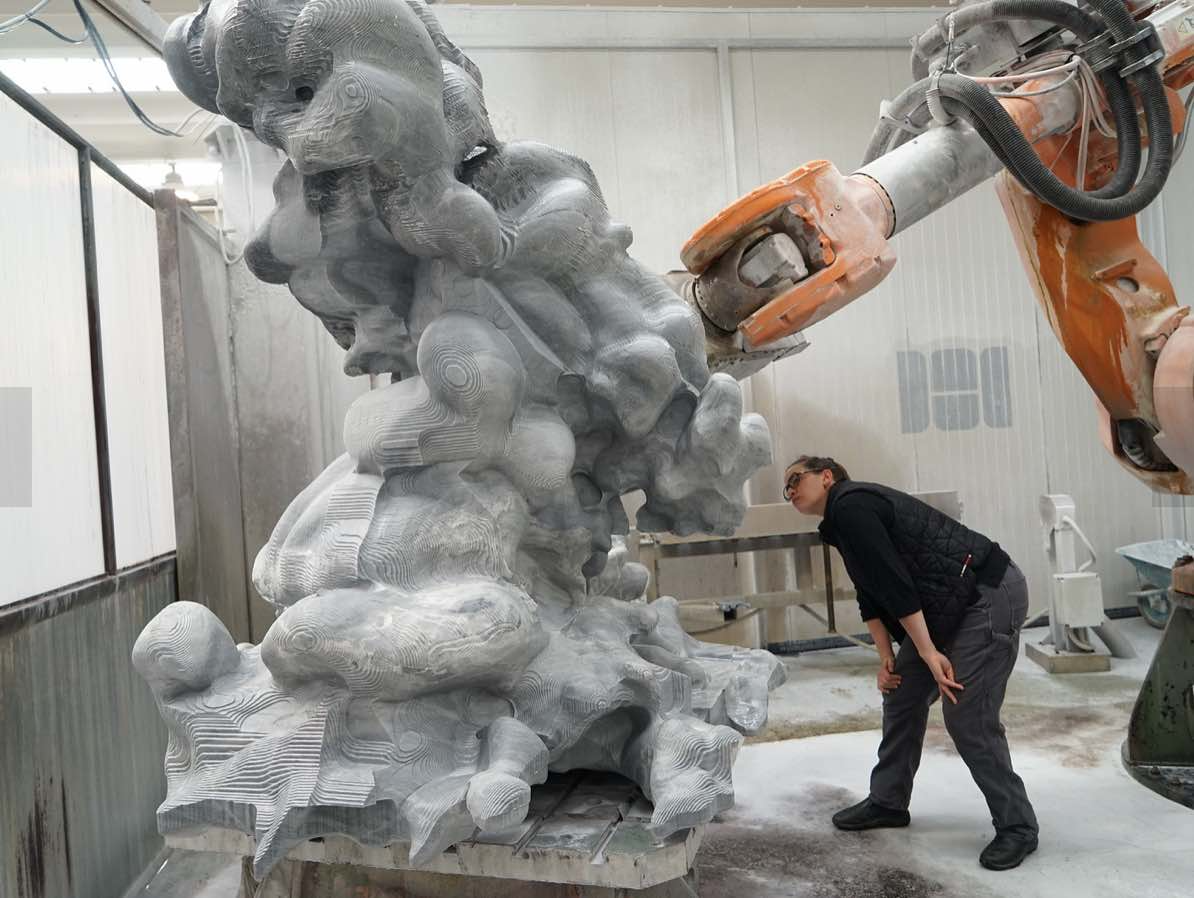
LaMonte examines her marble work Cumulus (2017).

Cumulus cloud|Cumulus (2017) is LaMonte's first major work of Italian marble. She was drawn to the medium because she wanted "to use a material forged by the forces of nature to represent the forces of nature." The sculpture is eight feet tall and weighs two and a half tons; it was modeled on climatological data from real-life weather and was carved with the help of robots and a super-computer.

"Only by using technology could I make the diaphanous solid and the intangible permanent," LaMonte told Caltech magazine.

Cumulus was first displayed at the Venice Biennale at Glasstress, Palazzo Franchetti, Venice.

== Selected awards ==
- Corning Museum of Glass / Corning Incorporated, Specialty Glass Artist-in-Residence, 2018
- James Renwick Alliance, Masters of the Medium Award, 2015
- Corning Museum of Glass / Kohler Arts Center, Joint Artist-in-Residence Program, 2009
- Jutta Cuny Franz Memorial Award, Laureate, 2007
- Japan-United States Friendship Commission, NEA, 2006
- Creative Artists Exchange Fellowship Program, 2006
- The Virginia A. Groot Foundation, Recognition Award, 2005
- UrbanGlass, Award for New Talent in Glass, 2002
- Creative Glass Center of America, Fellowship, 2002 and 1991
- The Louis Comfort Tiffany Foundation, Biennial Award, 2001
- Fulbright Fellowship, Czech Republic, 1999–2000

== Selected permanent collections ==
- University Museums at Iowa State, Ames, Iowa
- Crystal Bridges Museum of American Art, Bentonville, Arkansas
- Museum of Fine Arts, Boston, Massachusetts
- National Gallery of Australia, Canberra, Australia
- Hunter Museum of American Art, Chattanooga, Tennessee
- Cincinnati Art Museum, Cincinnati, Ohio
- The Museum of Art and Archaeology, Columbus, Missouri
- The Corning Museum, Corning, New York
- Flint Institute of Arts, Flint, Michigan
- Knoxville Museum of Art, Knoxville, Tennessee
- Spencer Museum of Art, Lawrence, Kansas
- The Speed Art Museum, Louisville, Kentucky
- Chazen Museum of Art, Madison, Wisconsin
- The Museum of American Glass, Wheaton Arts and Cultural Center, Millville, New Jersey
- Montgomery Museum of Fine Arts, Montgomery, Alabama
- Alexander Tutsek Foundation, Munich, Germany
- Chrysler Museum of Art, Norfolk, Virginia
- Oklahoma City Museum of Art, Oklahoma City, Oklahoma
- Palm Springs Art Museum, Palm Springs, California
- Musée des Arts Décoratifs, Paris, France
- Racine Art Museum and RAM's Charles A. Wustum Museum of Fine Arts, Racine, Wisconsin
- M. H. de Young Memorial Museum, San Francisco, California
- The John and Mable Ringling Museum of Art, Sarasota, Florida
- Imagine Museum, St. Petersburg, Florida
- The Toledo Museum of Art, Toledo, Ohio
- The Tucson Museum of Art, Tucson, Arizona
- Vero Beach Museum of Art, Vero Beach, Florida
- The Smithsonian Museum of American Art, Renwick Gallery, Washington DC

== Selected solo and group exhibitions ==
- 2021 Théâtre de le Mode. Barry Art Museum, Old Dominion University, Norfolk.
- 2019 Floating World. Imagine Museum, St. Petersburg, Florida.
- 2019 Glasstress 2019. Fondazione Berengo Art Space, Campiello Della Pescheria, Venice, Italy. Featured work: Reclining Nocturne 4 (2019).
- 2019 Divergent Materiality: Contemporary Glass Art. Scottsdale Museum of Contemporary Art, Scottsdale, Arizona. Featured work: Child's Dress (2011).
- 2018 Embodied Beauty. Hunter Museum of Art, Chattanooga Tennessee.
- 2018 Clothed in Light. Kampa Museum, Prague, Czech Republic.
- 2017 Glasstress 2017. Palazzo Franchetti, Venice, Italy. Featured works: Nocturne 1 (2017), Nocturne 6 (2017), Cumulus (2017), Nocturne 3 (2016), Reclining Nocturne 1 (2015).
- 2017 Floating World. Chazen Museum of Art, Madison, Wisconsin.
- 2016 Connections: Contemporary Craft at the Renwick Gallery. Smithsonian American Art Museum and the Renwick Gallery, Washington DC. Featured work: Reclining Dress Impression with Drapery (2009).
- 2015 Floating World. Museum of West Bohemia, Pilsen, Czech Republic.
- 2014 Dayton Celebrates Glass. Dayton Art Institute, Dayton, Ohio.
- 2013 Playing with Fire: 50 Years of Contemporary Glass. Museum of Art and Design, New York, New York.
- 2011 Kimono: Karen LaMonte & Prints of the Floating World. New Mexico Museum of Art, Santa Fe, New Mexico.
- 2011 Floating World. Imago Galleries, Palm Desert, California.
- 2010 Réflexions Féminines. Musée-Atelier départemental du Verre, Sars-Poteries, France.
- 2010 Drapery Abstractions. Heller Gallery, New York, New York.
- 2009 Contemporary Glass Among the Classics. Chrysler Museum of Art, Norfolk, Virginia.
- 2008 Karen LaMonte Sculptures. Glasmuseum Hentrich, Museum Kunst Palast, Düsseldorf, Germany.
- 2005 Absence Adorned. Museum of Glass International Center for Contemporary Art, Tacoma, Washington
- 2004 Vanitas. Czech Museum of Fine Art, Prague, Czech Republic.

== Selected publications ==
- Nocturnes. Authored by Dr. Steven Nash, Karen LaMonte (2019). Art Works Publishing. ISBN 978-0-988928411.
- Karen LaMonte: Floating World. Authored by Laura Addison, Karen LaMonte (2013). Art Works Publishing. ISBN 978-0988928404.
- Karen LaMonte: Absence Adorned. Authored by Arthur C. Danto, Juli Cho Bailer, Josi Callan (2005). Museum of Glass International Center for Contemporary Art. ISBN 978-0972664912.
- Vanitas. Authored by Petr Štěpán (2005). České Muzeum Výtvarných Umění / The Czech Museum of Fine Arts
- Sculptures and Sartoriotypes. Authored by Richard Drury (2003). Czech Museum of Fine Arts, Prague.
- Absent Impressions. Authored by Robert Bell (2002). National Gallery of Australia.
