= Cumulus (sculpture) =

Sculpture by Karen LaMonte

Cumulus is a monumental sculpture carved from Italian marble and based on the dimensions and weight of an atmospheric cumulus cloud. The work was created in 2017 by American artist Karen LaMonte and first displayed at the Glasstress exhibition during the 57th Venice Biennale. Cumulus stands seven feet tall, weighs two-and-a-half tons, and was carved by hand and robot. LaMonte worked with scientists from the California Institute of Technology, who used a supercomputer and weather modelling software to generate a three-dimensional cloud surface for LaMonte to replicate in stone.

== Concept and design ==
According to Hedge magazine, "It was the fascinating discovery that clouds could be hundreds of tonnes in weight that propelled American sculptor Karen LaMonte to create her magnificent, monumental, marble cloud sculpture, Cumulus."

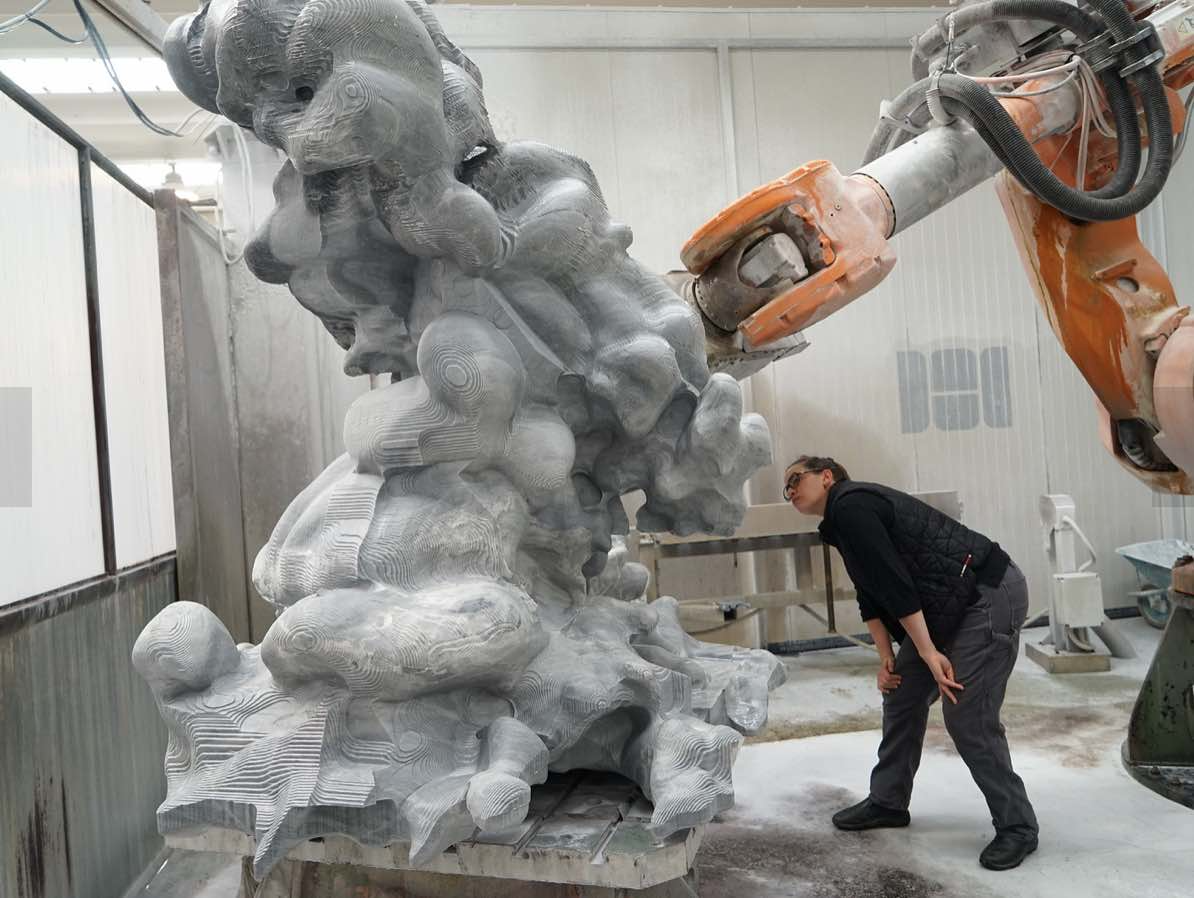
Cumulus in progress.

In articles published in Caltech magazine and Fine Art Connoisseur magazine, LaMonte described how Cumulus was conceptualized to authentically represent the form of a cumulus cloud. To create the work, LaMonte collaborated with Tapio Schneider and Kyle Pressel, atmospheric dynamics specialists and scientists at the California Institute of Technology's Climate Dynamics Group. Schneider and Pressel gathered source data from weather conditions that occurred during the 1969 Barbados Oceanographic and Meteorological Experiment and fed the information into a supercomputer located near Lake Lugano in Switzerland. Over a five day period, they used a weather simulation program to process the data and create a virtual weather system full of clouds that served as a guide for the sculpting process. The resulting data helped LaMonte "determine not only the exact shape of the cloud," she said in an interview with the Spence School, but also "an equivalency between the water weight of the model cloud and the actual weight of that marble cloud."

== Process ==
Cumulus was sculpted from a twenty-ton block of Carrara marble selected from a Tuscan mountain quarry that had previously supplied material for works by Michelangelo. Given the complexity of the Cumulus shape, LaMonte used automation software and robotic carving tools for the first phase of sculpting.

She described her use of robotics to Caltech magazine, and how the technological sophistication of the carving process was consistent with a tradition of innovation in marble sculpture:

Rarely does someone just start chipping away in stone. Think about Michelangelo; he submerged his wax model of David in water, exposing it layer by layer and carving the marble to match the emerging figure. Three hundred years later, Antonio Canova perfected the pointing machine to transfer exact points from a model onto marble, followed by Benjamin Cheverton's patented 3-D pantograph. Only by using technology could I make the diaphanous solid and the intangible permanent.

Following the robot carving phase, the work required four weeks of hand sculpting and finishing to complete.

== Themes ==
Cumulus incorporates themes of the human body and physicality. In an essay published in 2020, LaMonte described similarities between Cumulus and motifs she has explored in other works, including her sculptures of women's dresses with the wearer absent:

Although based on a real cloud, the sculpture Cumulus looks decidedly biomorphic, like a mountain of nude figures. Baroque in its physicality, it suggests folds of flesh or fabric tumbling through space.

Cumulus also reflects themes of technology and innovation, as LaMonte told Caltech magazine:

Every aspect of the project forced me to engage with new technologies. I needed data to divine the form, a supercomputer to model the weather, scientists to calculate the water weight of the cloud, and the precision afforded by robots to transfigure a real cloud into marble with an exact weight equivalency.

In reaction to Cumulus, Cloud Appreciation Society founder Gavin Pretor-Pinney noted that the word "cloud" is derived from the Old English word "clud," which refers to a mass or rock or earth. He expressed intrigue at seeing "a cloud made of rock, since this is where the word originally came from."

In an interview with Art Daily, LaMonte stated that "Cumulus focuses peoples' attention on weather and climate change. There could not be a more appropriate city for that than Venice." The city where Cumulus was first displayed, Venice has become increasingly threatened by flooding as global warming intensifies. A 2019 article in Alice magazine stated that Cumulus is the first in a series of sculptures by LaMonte that examine similar themes of weather and climate change.

== Related artworks ==
- Calais Pier, J.M.W. Turner
- Cumulus, Tony Cragg
- Fog sculptures, Fujiko Nakaya
- The Kidnapping of the Sabine Women, Giambologna
- Nimbus II, Berndnaut Smilde
- Nuclear Energy, Henry Moore
- Quantum Cloud, Antony Gormley
- Scholar Rock sculptures, Zhan Wang
