= Monoprinting =

Printmaking technique

Monoprinting is a type of printmaking where the intent is to make unique prints, that may explore an image serially. Other methods of printmaking create editioned multiples, the monoprint is editioned as 1 of 1. There are many techniques of mono-printing, in particular the monotype. Printmaking techniques which can be used to make mono-prints include lithography, woodcut, and etching.

== Types ==
A monoprint is a single impression of an image made from a reprintable block. Materials such as metal plates, litho stones or wood blocks are used for etching upon. Rather than printing multiple copies of a single image, only one impression may be produced, either by painting or making a collage on the block. Etching plates may also be inked in a way that is expressive and unique in the strict sense, in that the image cannot be reproduced exactly. Monoprints may also involve elements that change, where the artist reworks the image in between impressions or after printing so that no two prints are absolutely identical. Monoprints may include collage, hand-painted additions, and a form of tracing by which thick ink is laid down on a table, paper is placed on top and is then drawn on, transferring the ink onto the paper. Monoprints can also be made by altering the type, color, and pressure of the ink used to create different prints. When you create a monoprint, it is possible to copy work from separate pieces of artwork onto one monoprint.

Monoprints are known as the most painterly method among the printmaking techniques; it is essentially a printed painting. The characteristic of this method is that no two prints are alike. The beauty of this medium is also in its spontaneity and it is a combination of printmaking, painting and also drawing media.

== Technique ==
Monoprinting and monotyping are similar but not identical. Both involve the transfer of ink from a plate to the paper, canvas, or other surface that will ultimately hold the work of art. In monoprinting, an artist creates a reusable template of the intended image. Templates may include stencils, metal plates and flat stones. This form of printing produces multiple prints from the same template. Monotyping, in contrast, involves the use of an impermanent image that degrades after just one print. For example, one form of monotype transfers painted images from a gelatin plate onto a sheet of paper. Upon completion, the image no longer remains on the gelatin plate.

Monoprints can be thought of as variations on a theme, with the theme resulting from some permanent features being found on the template – lines, textures – that persist from print to print. Variations are endless, but permanent features of the template will persist from one print to the next.

Monoprinting has been used by many artists, among them Georg Baselitz. Some old master prints, like etchings by Rembrandt with individual manipulation of ink as "surface tone", or hand-painted etchings by Degas (usually called monotypes) might be classifiable as monoprints, but they are rarely so described.

== See also ==
- Monotyping
