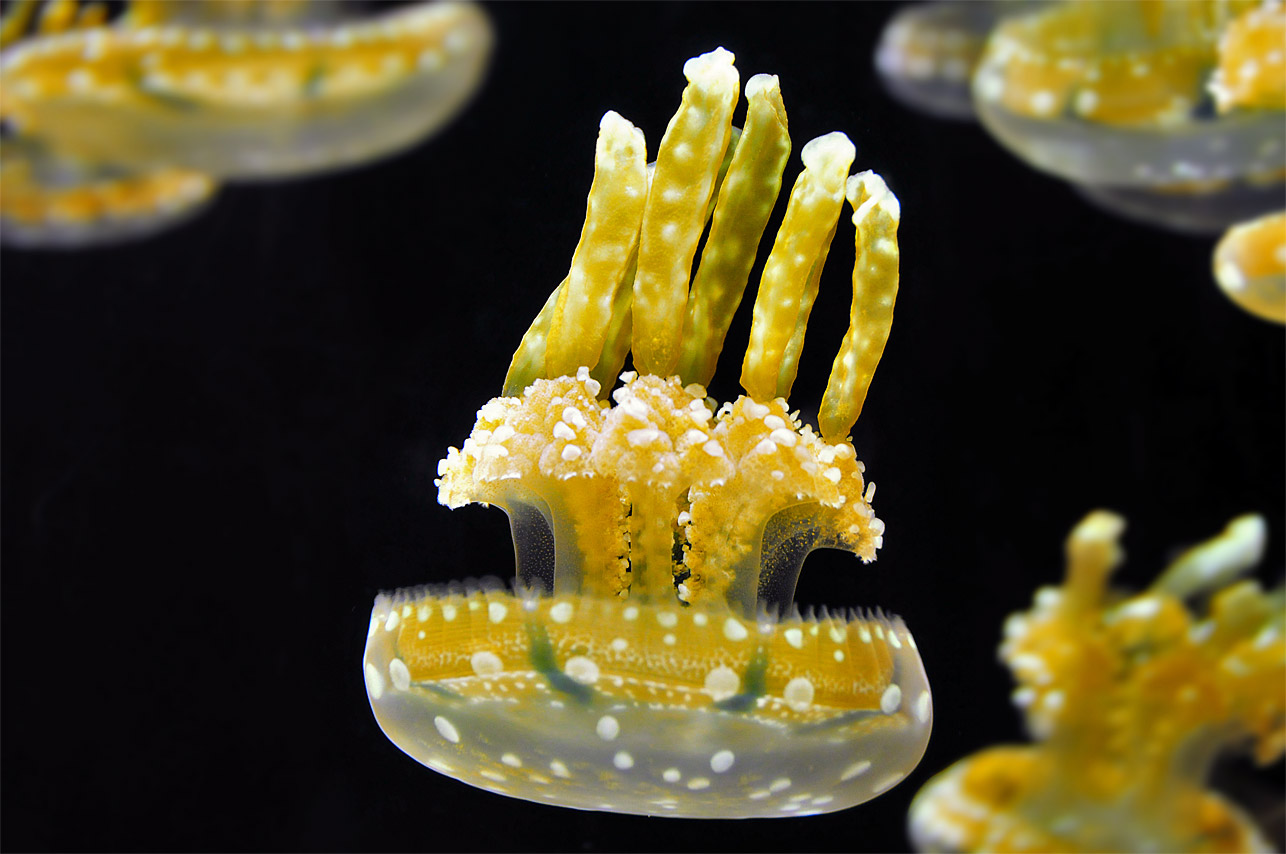
- Specimens at the Monterey Bay Aquarium

Scientific classification
- Kingdom: Animalia
- Phylum: Cnidaria
- Class: Scyphozoa
- Order: Rhizostomeae
- Family: Mastigiidae
- Genus: Mastigias
- Species: M. papua

Binomial name
- Mastigias papua Lesson, 1830

Synonyms
- Cephea papua Lesson, 1830; Mastigias papua var. Sibogae Maas, 1903; Mastigias physophora Kishinouye, 1895; Pseudorhiza thocambaui Agassiz & Mayer, 1899

= Spotted jelly =

Species of jellyfish

The spotted jelly (Mastigias papua), lagoon jelly, golden medusa, or Papuan jellyfish, is a species of jellyfish from the Indo-Pacific oceans. Like corals, sea anemones, and other sea jellies, it belongs to the phylum Cnidaria, which possess stinging cells called cnidocytes. Mastigias papua is one of the numerous marine animals living in symbiosis with zooxanthellae, photosynthetic algae within the animal's tissues.

A number of Mastigias populations referred to this species were isolated to various marine lakes in prehistory, and these isolated populations underwent various adaptations, such as the loss of their ability to sting.

== Taxonomy ==
Five subspecies referred (cf.) to this species have been described, inhabiting separate marine lakes in the Palau group.

- M. cf. p. remengesaui (in Uet era Ongael)
- M. cf. p. nakamurai (in Goby Lake)
- M. cf. p. etpisoni (in Ongeim’l Tketau)
- M. cf. p. saliii (in Clear Lake)
- M. cf. p. remeliiki (in Uet era Ngermeuangel)

A population inhabiting the marine lake within Kakaban island, Indonesia is also referred to this species.

== Description ==
Video of Mastigias papua in an aquarium

The spotted jelly has distinctive spots atop its bell, and vary in colouration, from greenish blue to olive green, which can be attributed to the zooxanthellae which reside within their tissues. There are eight rhopalia on the bell's margin, which act as the sensory organs of the jellyfish.

They average around 10 cm (3.9 in) in diameter, but can grow as large as 30 cm (12 in).

They have 8 frilled oral arms, which end in a clublike appendage. The upper surfaces of these arms are covered in stinging cells called cnidocytes. Unlike many other jellies, spotted jellyfish have numerous mouths along the bottom of their oral arms.

The insular populations inhabiting marine lakes, such as the one within Kakaban island, have undergone changes to their morphology compared to those inhabiting the ocean. Among these, the length of their tentacles have decreased: despite being over 3 times larger in diameter, jellyfish within the lake had comparable tentacle lengths to those in the surrounding ocean. Their nematocytes have also atrophied, and the environmental conditions are thought to denature the protein-based venom Mastigias produce. As a result, the jellyfish inhabiting marine lakes do not sting humans, and are harmless to the touch.

== Feeding ==
These jellies feed on zooplankton and other tiny organisms using their cnidocytes. The spotted jelly has several small mouths used to grab animal plankton.

Spotted jellies also acquire much of their nutrition via an endosymbiotic relationship with photosynthetic zooxathellae, such as those of the genus Cladocopium. The zooxathellae provide the jellyfish with nutrients, and in return the zooxanthellae get a safe place to live. This symbiotic relationship is not unique to the spotted jellyfish, and can also be observed in species such as the upside-down jellyfish.

During the night, these jellyfish stay lower in the water column and migrate each day, rising to the waters surface, and following the sun east to west, to allow their zooxanthellae access to the light they need to photosynthesize.

== Habitat ==
Spotted jellies range throughout the Indo-Pacific, from the Fijian archipelago to the western Indian Ocean, and from Japan to Australia.

Some populations of spotted jellies in Palau have been found to occur in huge groups (called "smacks"), which have become tourist attractions. The most famous spot to admire them is the Ongeim’l Tketau Lake in Palau, also known as Jellyfish Lake.

== Predators ==
Spotted jellies are predated upon by the sea anemone Entacmaea medusivora, which capture the jellyfish in their tentacles. While the jellyfish is captured by the anemone, an enterprising gastropod or fish may scavenge upon the captured jellyfish before the anemone is finished consuming it.
