= Goby Lake =

Marine lake on Koror island, Palau

- Location within Palau
- Location: Koror, Palau
- Coordinates: 7°18′55″N 134°30′07″E
- Lake type: Meromictic
- Basin countries: Palau
- Max. length: 260 m (900 ft)
- Surface area: 2.1 ha (5 acres)
- Max. depth: 18 m (100 ft)
- Frozen: never
- Islands: none
- Settlements: none

Goby Lake is a marine lake located on Koror island in Palau. There are about 70 other marine lakes located throughout the Rock Islands and Koror. Goby Lake is notable for endemic subspecies of golden jellyfish and is one of five marine lakes in Palau used for several scientific researches in evolutionary biology the other lakes being Jellyfish Lake, Clear Lake (Palau), Uet era Ngermeuangel, Uet era Ongael.

== Golden jellyfish ==
Clear Lake is connected to the ocean through fissures and tunnels in the limestone of ancient Miocene reef. However the lake is sufficiently isolated and the conditions are different enough that the diversity of species in the lake is greatly reduced from the nearby lagoon. The golden jellyfish Mastigias cf. papua nakamurai and possibly other species in the lake have evolved to be substantially different from their close relatives living in the nearby lagoons. The lake is rich with several species of fish, including goby, giving the lake its name.

== Lake stratification ==
The deepest - north-eastern - part of Goby Lake is stratified into two layers, an oxygenated upper layer (mixolimnion) and a lower anoxic layer (monimolimnion). The oxygen concentration in the lake declines from about 6 mg/L at the surface to zero at 10 meters (at the chemocline). Stratification is persistent and seasonal mixing does not occur. The lake is one of about 200 saline meromictic lakes that have been identified in the world. However most of these lakes are of freshwater origin. Permanently stratified marine lakes are unusual, but in Palau there are eleven other permanently stratified marine lakes, the most renowned one is Jellyfish Lake.
