= Geophysical dynamics =

Geophysical dynamics may refer to:

- Geodynamics, the study of the dynamics of the Earth's mantle and core
- Geophysical fluid dynamics, the study of large-scale fluid motions in the ocean and atmosphere
