= Uet era Ongael =

Marine lake on Ongael Island, Palau

Uet era Ongael Ongael Lake
- Location within Palau
- Location: Ongael Island, Koror, Palau
- Coordinates: 7°15′26″N 134°22′57″E
- Lake type: Holomictic
- Basin countries: Palau
- Max. length: 100 m (300 ft)
- Surface area: 0.9 ha (2 acres)
- Max. depth: 4 m (0 ft)
- Frozen: never
- Islands: none
- Settlements: none

Uet era Ongael (Ongael Lake) is a marine lake located on Ongael Island, Koror, in Palau. There are about 70 other marine lakes located throughout the Rock Islands and Koror. Uet era Ongael is notable for endemic subspecies of golden jellyfish and is one of five marine lakes in Palau used for several scientific researches in evolutionary biology, the other lakes being Jellyfish Lake, Clear Lake, Uet era Ngermeuangel and Goby Lake.

== Golden jellyfish ==
Uet era Ongael is connected to the ocean through fissures and tunnels in the limestone of ancient Miocene reefs. However the lake is sufficiently isolated and the conditions are different enough that the diversity of species in the lake is greatly reduced from the nearby lagoon. The golden jellyfish Mastigias cf. papua remengesaui is substantially different from their close relatives living in the nearby lagoons. This is the most ornate of Palau lake jellyfishes, with solid white spots; younger jellyfish have a pale blue color. The small lake is also home to jellyfish of other species (Aurelia sp., Cassiopea sp.).

== Lake morphology ==
Uet era Ongael is the smallest and shallowest Palau lake with registered endemic subspecies of jellyfish. The lake is holomictic - it does not have layers as it is comparatively shallow and with low banks, permitting for winds and sea tides to mix the water.
