= Clear Lake (Palau) =

Marine lake on Eil Malk island, Palau

- Clearwater Lake
- Location within Palau
- Location: Eil Malk, Rock Islands, Palau
- Coordinates: 7°09′09″N 134°21′34″E
- Lake type: Meromictic
- Basin countries: Palau
- Max. length: 330 m (1,100 ft)
- Surface area: 3.9 ha (10 acres)
- Max. depth: 30 m (100 ft)
- Frozen: never
- Islands: none
- Settlements: none

Clear Lake (also Clearwater Lake) is a marine lake located on Eil Malk island in Palau. Eil Malk (also Mecherchar) is part of the Rock Islands, a group of small, rocky, mostly uninhabited islands in Palau's Southern Lagoon, between Koror and Peleliu. There are about 70 other marine lakes located throughout the Rock Islands. Clear Lake is notable for endemic subspecies of golden jellyfish and is one of five marine lakes in Palau used for several scientific researches in evolutionary biology, the other lakes being Jellyfish Lake, Goby Lake, Uet era Ngermeuangel, Uet era Ongael.

== Golden jellyfish ==
Clear Lake is one of the oldest of meromictic marine lakes in Palau and is circa 15,000 - 12,000 years old. It is connected to the ocean through fissures and tunnels in the limestone of ancient Miocene reef. However the lake is sufficiently isolated and the conditions are different enough that the diversity of species in the lake is greatly reduced from the nearby lagoon. The golden jellyfish Mastigias cf. papua salii and possibly other species in the lake have evolved to be substantially different from their close relatives living in the nearby lagoons.

== Lake stratification ==
Clear Lake is stratified into two layers, an oxygenated upper layer (mixolimnion) and a lower anoxic layer (monimolimnion). The oxygen concentration in the lake declines from about 6 mg/L at the surface to zero at 16 meters (at the chemocline). Stratification is persistent and seasonal mixing does not occur. The lake is one of about 200 saline meromictic lakes that have been identified in the world. However most of these lakes are of freshwater origin. Permanently stratified marine lakes are unusual, but on Eil Malk and on other nearby islands there are eleven other permanently stratified marine lakes, the most renowned one is Jellyfish Lake.
