= Cline (hydrology) =

List of clines in hydrology

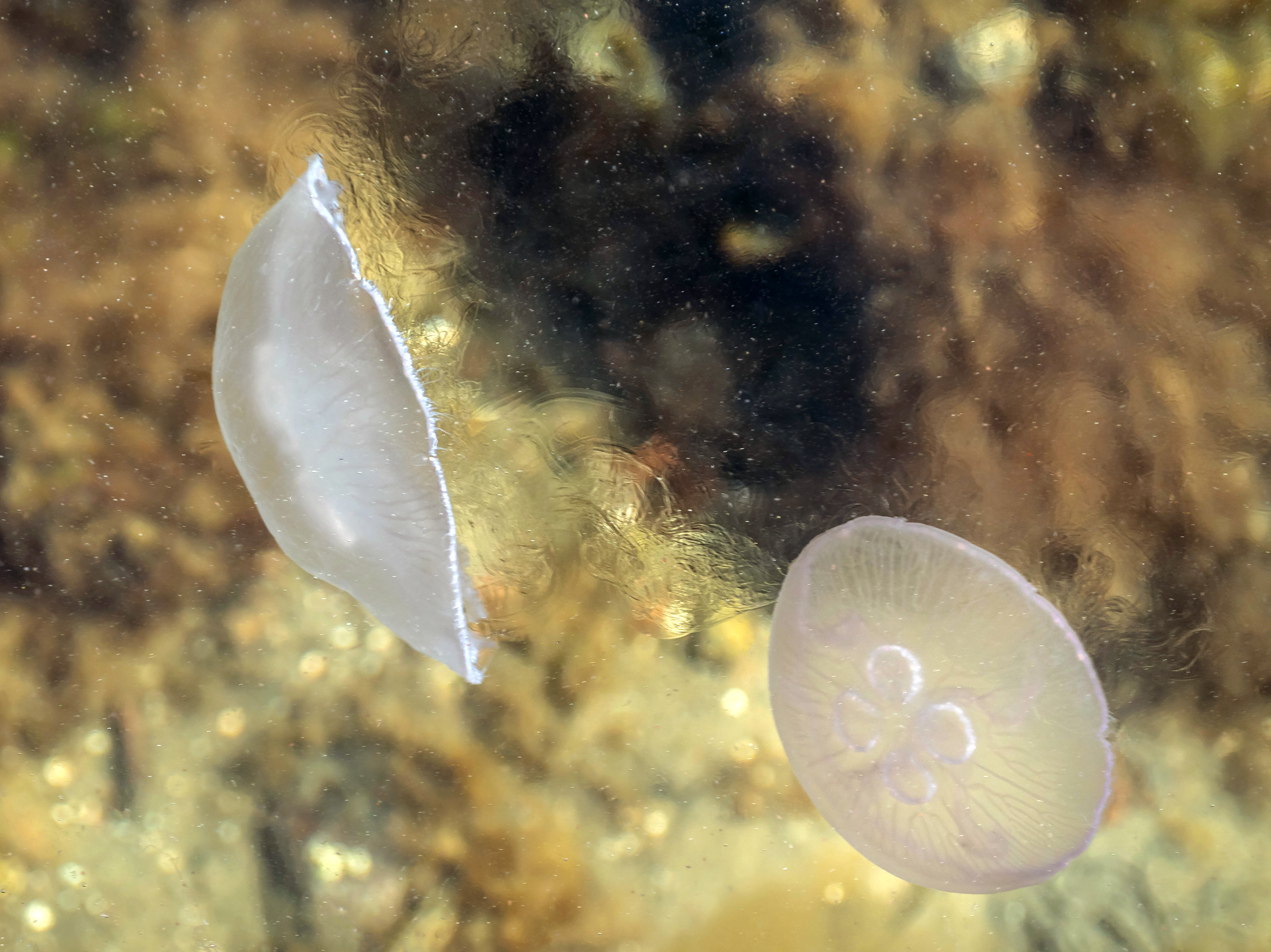
Two moon jellyfish disturbing a thermocline in the top water layer of Gullmarn fjord, Sweden

In hydrology and related studies, a cline (from Ancient Greek κλίνειν (klínein) 'to lean') is a comparatively thin, typically horizontal layer within a fluid, in which a property of the fluid varies greatly over a relatively short vertical distance.

Such clines and the respectively varying properties include:

- Chemocline - chemistry
- Halocline - salinity
- Lysocline - dissolution of calcite
- Pycnocline - density
- Thermocline - temperature
