= Jellyfish Lake =

Marine lake in Palau

- Ongeim'l Tketau (Palauan)
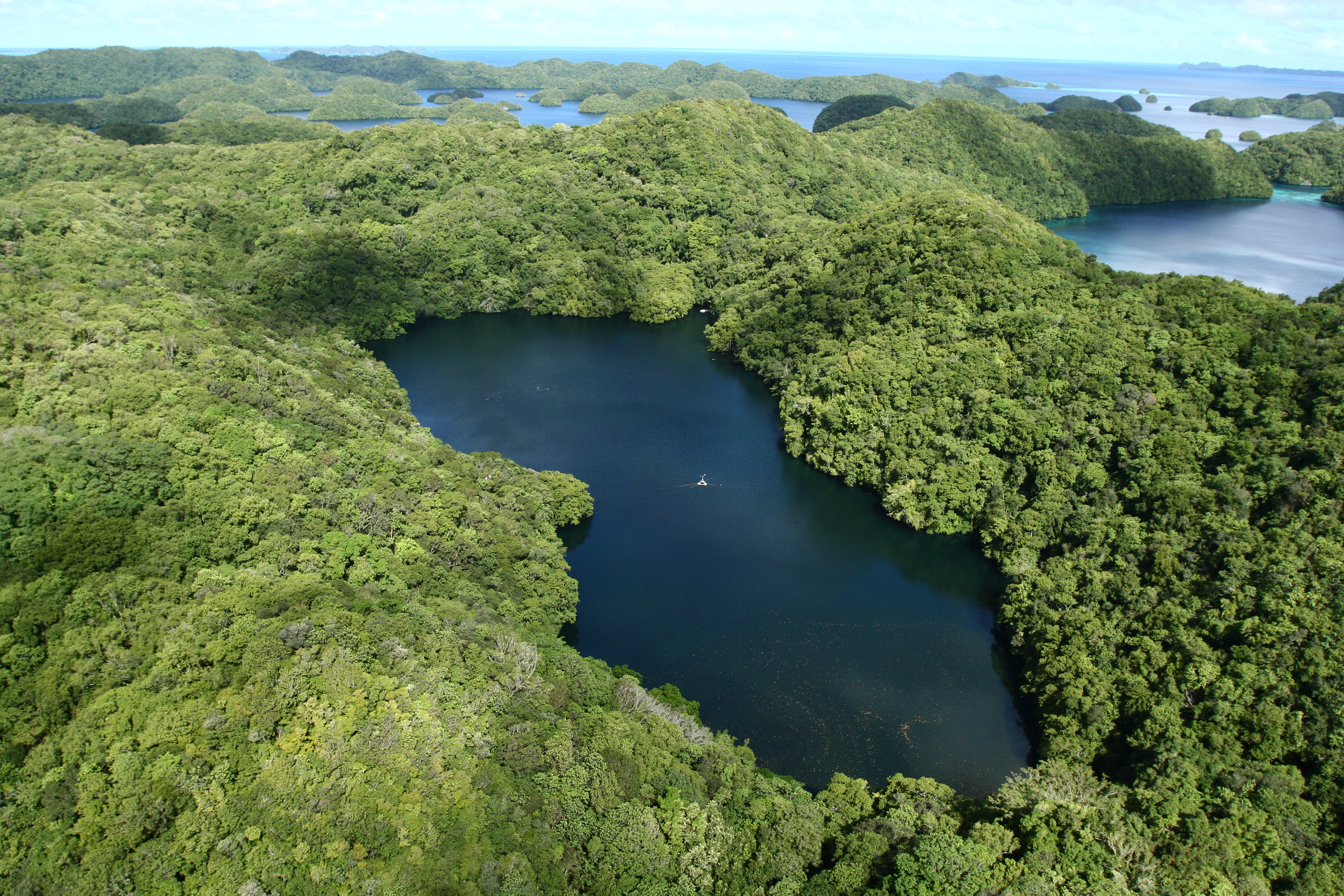
- Aerial view, looking west

- Location within Palau
- Location: Eil Malk, Rock Islands, Palau
- Coordinates: 7°09′40″N 134°22′34″E
- Type: Meromictic
- Basin countries: Palau
- Max. length: 460 m (1,510 ft)
- Max. width: 160 m (520 ft)
- Surface area: 5.7 ha (14 acres)
- Average depth: 30 m (100 ft)
- Water volume: 1.71 million m^{3} (60 million cu ft)
- Surface elevation: Sea level
- Frozen: Never
- Islands: None

Jellyfish Lake (Palauan: Ongeim'l Tketau, lit. 'Fifth Lake') is a marine lake located on Eil Malk island in Palau. Eil Malk is a part of the Rock Islands, a group of small, rocky, mostly uninhabited islands in Palau's Southern Lagoon, between Koror and Peleliu. There are about 70 other marine lakes located throughout the Rock Islands. Millions of golden jellyfish migrate horizontally across the lake daily.

Jellyfish Lake is connected to the ocean through fissures and tunnels in the limestone of an ancient Miocene reef. However, the lake is sufficiently isolated and the conditions are different enough that the diversity of species in the lake is greatly reduced from the nearby lagoon. The golden jellyfish, Mastigias papua etpisoni, and possibly other species in the lake, have evolved to be substantially different from their close relatives living in the nearby lagoons.

== Lake stratification ==
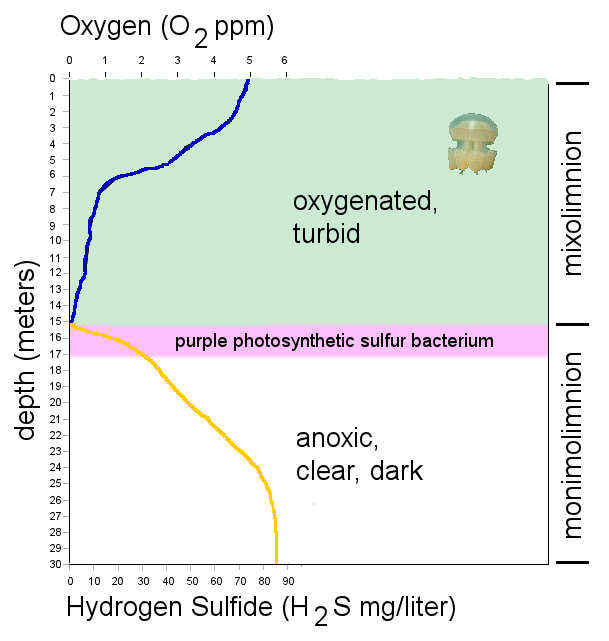
Stratification diagram

Jellyfish Lake is stratified into two layers, an oxygenated upper layer (mixolimnion) and a lower anoxic layer (monimolimnion). The oxygen concentration in the lake declines from about 5 ppm at the surface to zero at 15 meters (at the chemocline). Stratification is persistent and seasonal mixing does not occur. The lake is one of about 200 saline meromictic lakes that have been identified in the world. However most of these lakes are of freshwater origin. Permanently stratified marine lakes are unusual, but on Eil Malk and on other nearby islands there are eleven other apparently permanent stratified marine lakes.

The stratification of the lake is caused by conditions which prevent or restrict the mixing of water vertically. These conditions include:

1. The lake is surrounded by rock walls and trees which substantially block the wind flow across the lake that would cause mixing.
2. The primary water sources for the lake (rain, runoff and tidal flows through tunnels) are all close to the surface.
3. The lake is in the tropics where seasonal temperature variation is small, and so the temperature inversion that can cause vertical mixing of lakes in temperate zones does not occur.

The oxygenated layer extends from the surface to about 15 metres (49 ft). All organisms that require oxygen live in this layer including the jellyfish, a few species of fish and copepods. This layer is somewhat turbid. Visibility is limited to about 5 metres (16 ft). The salinity of this layer down to about 3 metres (9.8 ft) is affected by rain and runoff, and below this, salinity levels are unaffected by freshwater inputs.

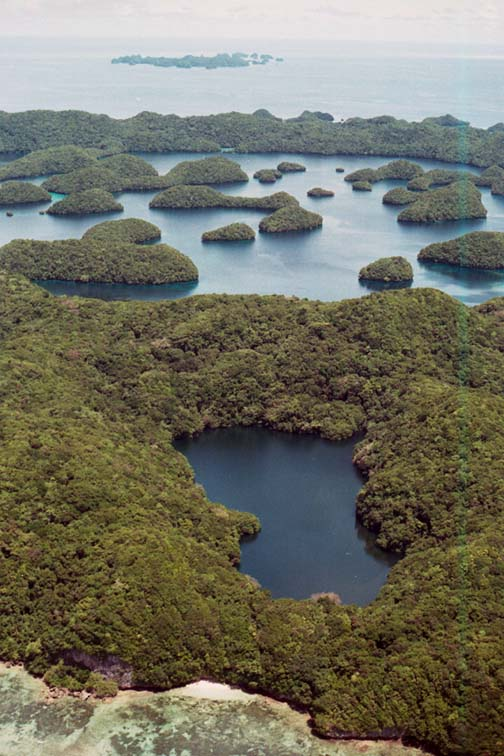
Aerial view of Jellyfish Lake, looking out to sea

The lake is connected to the sea via three tunnels that lie near the surface. The tunnels channel tidal water in and out of the lake. Tide levels in the lake are damped to about a third of the lagoon tidal levels. The tidal peaks are delayed from the lagoon tidal peaks by about 1 hour and forty minutes. Biologist William Hamner estimated that about 2.5% of the lake's volume is exchanged during a tidal flow. However, because the tidal water enters at the surface, the lower anoxic layer is largely unaffected by tidal flows.

Research has shown that the jellyfish population plays an important role in mixing the water and its content of oxygen and nutrients in the lake.

The anoxic layer extends from about 15 metres (49 ft) below the surface to the bottom of the lake. The oxygen concentration in this layer is zero. The hydrogen sulfide concentration rises from about zero at the top of this layer to over 80 mg/liter at the bottom of the lake. The top three meters of this layer contains a dense population of bacteria, at least one species of which is a purple photosynthetic sulfur bacterium. This bacterial layer absorbs all sunlight so that the anoxic layer below the bacterial plate is dark, but transparent. Hamner estimated the visibility to be about 30 meters. The anoxic layer also contains high concentrations of ammonia and phosphate which are almost completely absent from the upper layer. The anoxic layer is potentially dangerous for divers, who can be poisoned through their skin. This risk is mitigated as scuba diving equipment is not allowed in the lake, thus limiting the depths to which individuals may dive.

== Age of the lake ==
Jellyfish Lake is around 12,000 years old. This age estimate is based on the depth of the lake (about 30 meters), an estimate of the thickness of the sediment (at least 20 meters) and the rising sea level since the end of the last ice age. About 12,000 years ago, the sea level had risen to the point that sea water began to fill the Jellyfish Lake basin.

== Jellyfish species ==
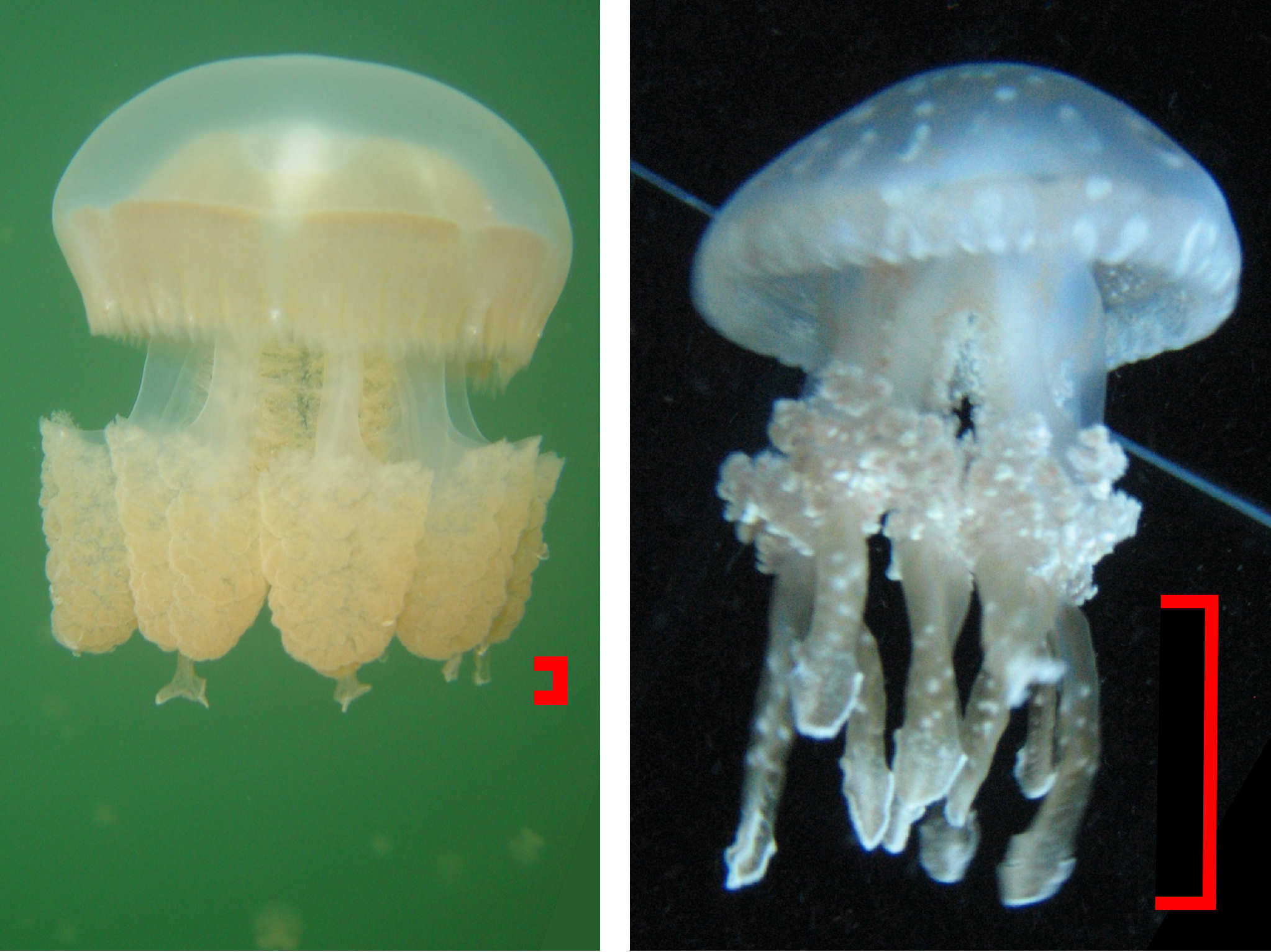
Golden and spotted jellyfish comparison. Note the loss of spots, color and greatly reduced clubs in the golden jellyfish from Jellyfish Lake

Two species of scyphozoan jellyfish live in Jellyfish Lake, moon jellyfish (Aurelia sp.) and the golden jellyfish (Mastigias sp.).

=== Golden jellyfish ===
The golden jellyfish are most closely related to the spotted jellyfish (Mastigias papua) that inhabit the nearby lagoons. They are similar to the spotted jellyfish in that they derive part of their nutrition from symbiotic algae (Zooxanthellae) that live in their tissues and part of their nutrition from captured zooplankton.

However, the golden jellyfish are morphologically, physiologically, and behaviourally distinct from the spotted jellyfish. They are easily distinguished from the spotted jellyfish by the almost complete loss of spots on the exumbrella and the almost complete loss of their clubs, an appendage attached to the oral arms.

Marine biologist Michael Dawson proposed that the golden jellyfish that inhabit Jellyfish Lake be classified as a subspecies (Mastigias cf. papua etpisoni) of the spotted jellyfish living in the nearby lagoons. The species identification is uncertain (denoted by cf. in the name) because the Mastigias papua local to Palauan lagoons may be only one of several cryptic species that make up the M. papua group, and in the future, the M. papua local to Palau may be identified as a separate species from other M. papua. He also proposed that the jellyfish living in four other Palauan marine lakes were distinctive enough to deserve recognition as unique subspecies.

=== Moon jellyfish ===
The moon jellyfish were identified as Aurelia aurita by Hamner. However, since the release of that report in 1981, genetic testing has been done on specimens of Aurelia collected from locations throughout the world. The results of that testing indicate in addition to the three named species of Aurelia there are at least six other cryptic species in the genus. Three of the cryptic species identified were from Palau. One of these cryptic species is common to four of Palau's marine lakes with jellyfish populations including Jellyfish Lake. Hence, the most accurate designation for the moon jellyfish in Jellyfish Lake (as of February 2001) is Aurelia sp. Despite the close proximity of Palau's moon jellyfish cryptic species, Dawson and Jacobs stated that the molecular data suggested that they had not interbred for millions of years.

== Quotidian migration ==
=== Golden jellyfish ===
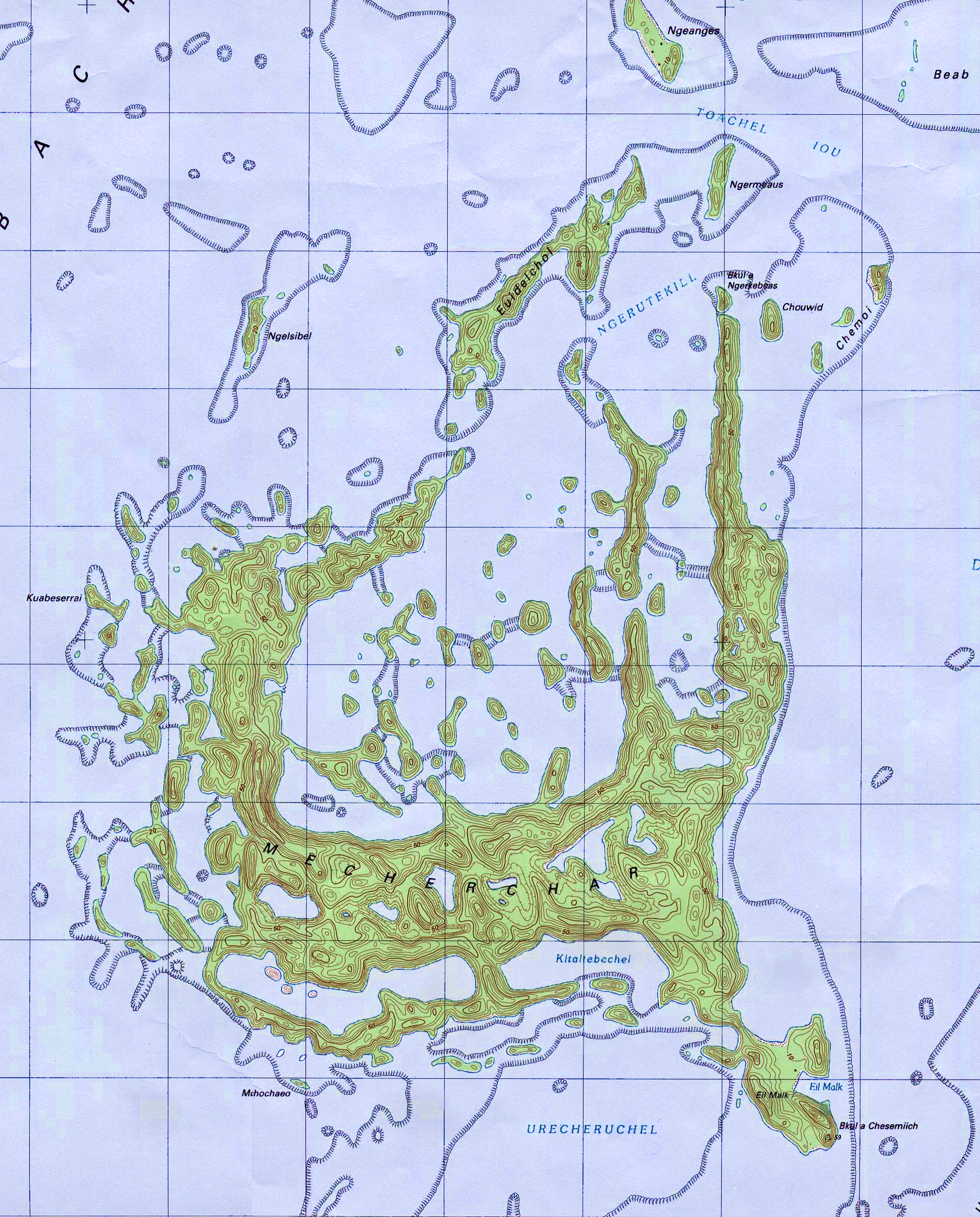
Map of Eil Malk with Jellyfish Lake in the eastern part of the main island

The golden jellyfish migration pattern is as follows:

- Night - For about 14 hours a day the jellyfish make repeated vertical excursions between the surface and the chemocline in the western basin possibly to acquire nitrogen and other nutrients from near the chemocline for their symbiotic algae.
- From early morning to about 0930 - The jellyfish move from center of western basin to the eastern basin
- From early afternoon to about 1530 - The jellyfish move from eastern basin to near western end of lake
- As the sun sets - The jellyfish move briefly eastward from western end to western basin where they remain through the night

The golden jellyfish rotate counter-clockwise as they swim at the surface, presumably to provide even exposure to the sun for the symbiotic algae in their bodies.

The Jellyfish Lake golden jellyfish migration pattern is similar to Mastigias sp. in other Palauan marine lakes and coves which all migrate west to east in the morning. However the migration patterns in other Palauan coves and marine lakes are less well defined than that of the Jellyfish Lake golden jellyfish. The east to west migration in all of these other lakes (except for Clear Lake on Eil Malk) does not begin until the late afternoon.

Hamner and Dawson proposed that the difference is caused by evolutionary change driven by the jellyfish-eating anemones (Entacmaea medusivora) that inhabit the eastern regions of Jellyfish Lake and Clear Lake. The jellyfish instinctively avoid shadows and in the morning with the shadows on the eastern end the jellyfish also avoid the anemones. By moving east to west in the early afternoon the jellyfish avoid the time of day when the setting sun would eliminate shadows on the lake in the eastern end and thereby avoid the anemones in the afternoon.

=== Moon jellyfish ===
The moon jellyfish do not have an organized horizontal migration pattern. At night they migrate to the surface presumably to feed. The copepods that make up a significant portion of the moon jellyfish diet in Jellyfish Lake also migrate to the surface at night.

== Jellyfish die-off ==
=== Golden jellyfish ===
Beginning in about the fall of 1998, a precipitous decline in the golden jellyfish medusa population was detected in Jellyfish Lake. By December 1998, the medusa population had declined to zero.

Based on their extensive investigation of the disappearance of the golden jellyfish medusae, Dawson et al. determined that the most likely cause was an El Niño weather event that raised the water temperature, with the result that the symbiotic algae (Zooxanthellae) that live within the golden jellyfish medusae and the syphistomae (scyphozoan polyps) could not survive.

In January 2000, the golden jellyfish medusae were observed in Jellyfish Lake for the first time since April 1999. By May 2012, the medusae population had returned to pre-decline levels.

Dawson et al. also surveyed the golden jellyfish populations in three other Palauan marine lakes. They found significant changes in the medusa population in two of these lakes, Clear Lake on Eil Malk and Goby Lake on Koror. The golden jellyfish population in Big Jellyfish Lake, Koror did not seem to be affected. The reason for this was not clear, but Big Jellyfish Lake experienced lower temperature increases than the other lakes and there was experimental evidence that the golden jellyfish medusa from Big Jellyfish Lake were more tolerant of higher temperatures.

Although Clear Lake did not seem to have experienced the complete medusa population die-off that Jellyfish Lake did in 1998, the golden jellyfish medusae in Clear Lake are not always present. When conditions are not favorable for the short lived medusa stage or for syphistomae strobilation, the medusae disappear in Clear Lake. The medusa population is reestablished by syphistomae strobilation when conditions are favorable for strobilation and medusae again.

A significant reduction in the Jellyfish Lake medusa population had also been noted in 1987. This was previously attributed to turbulence generated by scuba diving that caused disturbance of the toxic layer. However, given that it occurred within the time frame when an unusually high sea surface temperature had been detected, it might reasonably be surmised that a rise in water temperature was the most likely cause of the 1998 die-off.

=== Moon jellyfish ===
The moon jellyfish exhibited unusual damage in the 1998 time frame; however, the population seemed no smaller than usual.

== Tourism ==
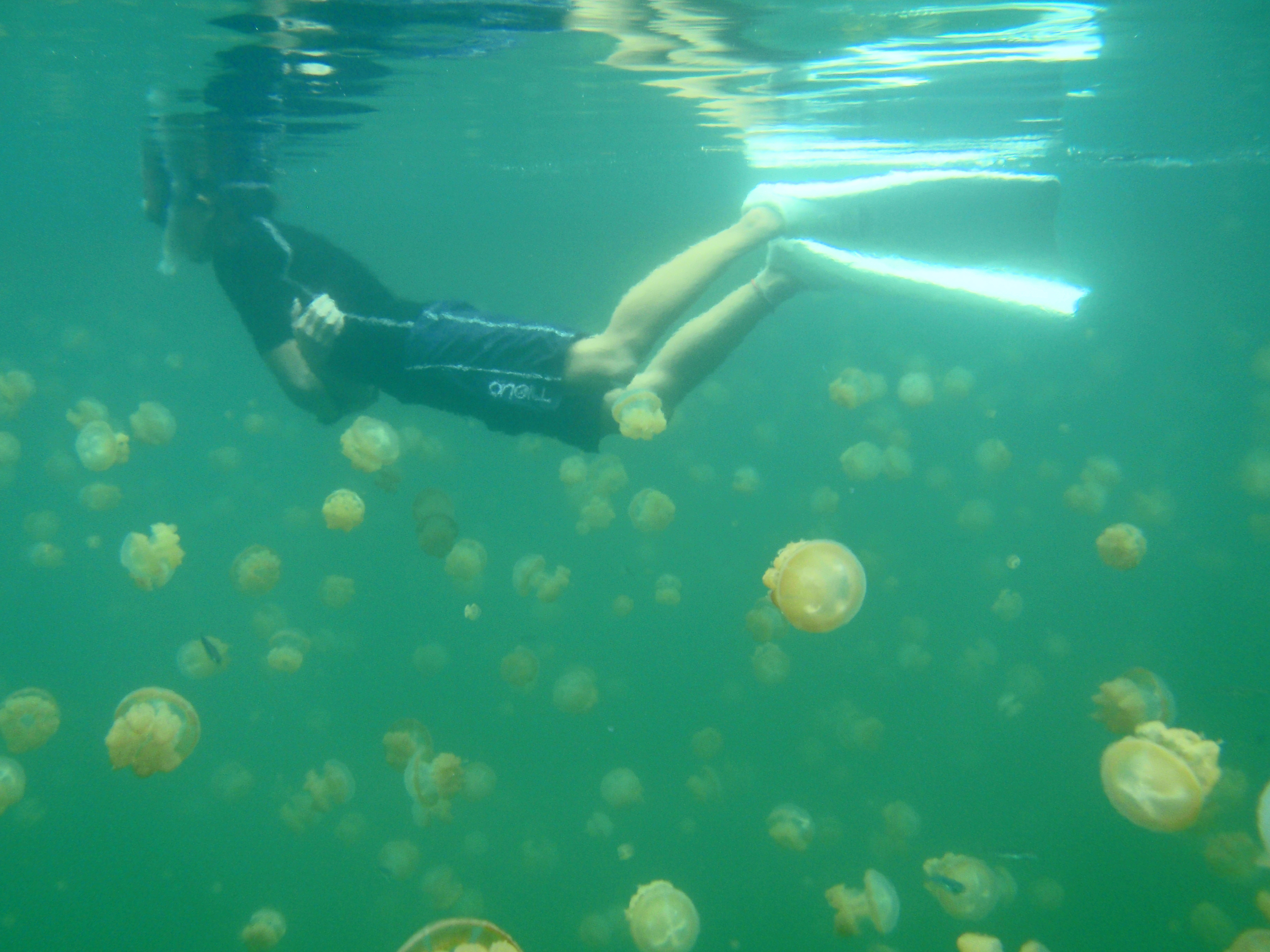
A swimmer snorkeling in Jellyfish Lake.

Tourists are required to obtain a pass to access Jellyfish Lake. The Rock Islands/Jellyfish Lake pass is $100 and is valid for 5 days.

Snorkeling in Jellyfish Lake is a popular activity for tourists to Palau. Several tour operators in Koror offer trips to the lake. Eil Malk island is approximately a 45-minute boat ride from Koror. The lake is accessed by a short trail from the beach on Eil Malk to the lake.

Scuba diving by tourists in the lake is not allowed. Two reasons are put forward for this:

- The bubbles from scuba tanks can harm the jellyfish if they collect beneath their bell.
- The anoxic layer that begins at about 15 meters contains high concentrations of hydrogen sulfide which can be absorbed through the skin of a diver which can lead to death.

Jellyfish Lake is currently the only one of Palau's marine lakes open to tourists.

=== Safety considerations ===
Although both species of jellyfish living in the lake have stinging cells (nematocytes), they are not in general powerful enough to cause harm to humans. It has been reported that it is possible to notice the stings on sensitive areas like the area around the mouth.

Saltwater crocodiles are native to Palau but there has only been one death attributed to them in recent times and they are generally not considered a threat to divers.

The hydrogen sulfide (H_{2}S) in the anoxic layer is a serious risk to scuba divers entering this layer, as the highly-toxic gas can be absorbed through the skin. In 1977, the maximum safe threshold level for H_{2}S was set at 10 ppm, and concentrations at the bottom of the anoxic layer exceed that by eightfold. However, the hydrogen sulfide concentration down to the chemocline at about 15 metres (49 ft) is reported to be zero, and if the anoxic layer is avoided, the H_{2}S in the lake does not pose a risk for snorkelers.
