= Thin layers (oceanography) =

Congregations of plankton

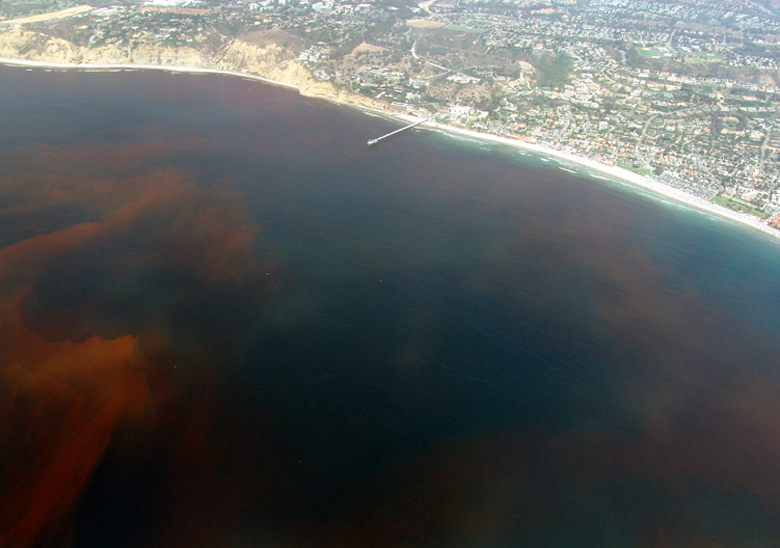
Visible layers of a red tide, a planktonic algal bloom, off the shores of Southern California.

Thin layers are concentrated aggregations of phytoplankton and zooplankton in coastal and offshore waters that are vertically compressed to thicknesses ranging from several centimeters up to a few meters and are horizontally extensive, sometimes for kilometers.

Generally, thin layers have three basic criteria: 1) they must be horizontally and temporally persistent; 2) they must not exceed a critical threshold of vertical thickness; and 3) they must exceed a critical threshold of maximum concentration. The precise values for critical thresholds of thin layers has been debated for a long time due to the vast diversity of plankton, instrumentation, and environmental conditions. Thin layers have distinct biological, chemical, optical, and acoustical signatures which are difficult to measure with traditional sampling techniques such as nets and bottles. However, there has been a surge in studies of thin layers within the past two decades due to major advances in technology and instrumentation. Phytoplankton are often measured by optical instruments that can detect fluorescence such as LIDAR, and zooplankton are often measured by acoustic instruments that can detect acoustic backscattering such as ABS.

These extraordinary concentrations of plankton have important implications for many aspects of marine ecology (e.g., phytoplankton growth dynamics, zooplankton grazing, behaviour, environmental effects, harmful algal blooms), as well as for ocean optics and acoustics. Zooplankton thin layers are often found slightly under phytoplankton layers because many feed on them. Thin layers occur in a wide variety of ocean environments, including estuaries, coastal shelves, fjords, bays, and the open ocean, and they are often associated with some form of vertical structure in the water column, such as pycnoclines, and in zones of reduced flow.

== Criteria ==
=== Persistence ===
Thin layers persist from hours to weeks while other small-scale patches of plankton exist for minutes. The presence of nutrients as well as coastal fronts, eddies, and upwelling zones greatly increase the persistence of thin layers. One of the main criteria for an aggregation of plankton to be considered a thin layer is that the increased concentration at a certain depth of the water column must appear in subsequently measured profiles. However, thin layers are dynamic and horizontally extensive so their persistence cannot be defined using multiple measurements at only one location. A study on the Karenia brevis algae responsible for more recent and increasingly longer red tide blooms shows that the cellular gene expression patterns are extremely diverse which means that this particular species of plankton are more resilient because they adapt well to changing conditions. Studies also indicate that red tide blooms are often terminated by interactions with other microbes such as viruses and bacteria that may either compete for the same nutrients or adversely impact the algal cells.

=== Thickness ===
Some studies have considered the maximum critical threshold for vertical thickness of thin layers as three meters, but more recent data has shown that the criteria can be relaxed to five meters. The horizontal extents of thin layers can reach tens of kilometers, and their horizontal to vertical aspect ratio is usually at least 1000:1.

=== Intensity ===
The intensity of a thin layer refers to the maximum concentration of the plankton within the layer relative to the background and the water column. Thin layer concentrations can range between three and 100 times more than the background and up to 75% of the total biomass in the water column.

== Formation ==
=== Buoyancy ===
Layers of phytoplankton found in the Arctic Ocean.

Thin layers of non-motile phytoplankton tend to collect at boundaries of strong vertical gradients in salinity (haloclines), temperature (thermoclines), and density (pycnoclines) which often coincide because they are directly proportional. These particular thin layers are formed by sinking non-motile phytoplankton reaching a neutral buoyancy at a pycnocline, and the stifling of vertical turbulent dispersion at these depths. Other studies have shown that gradients in nutrients (nutriclines) also contribute to the formation of thin layers.

=== Vertical Migration ===
Many zooplankton normally exhibit a diel vertical migration (DVM) pattern that dictates their depth in the water column based on the time of day. Phytoplankton require sunlight for photosynthesis and protein production, but they are not primarily attracted to light. This is evident by their single move up near the surface prior to sunrise and single move down into deeper waters prior to sunset. Their collective movements may result in the aggregation that form thin layers. These regular movements are thought to be governed by an internal clock in normal nutrient concentrations. However, they have also been observed to migrate irregularly when nutrient concentrations are higher or lower than normal.

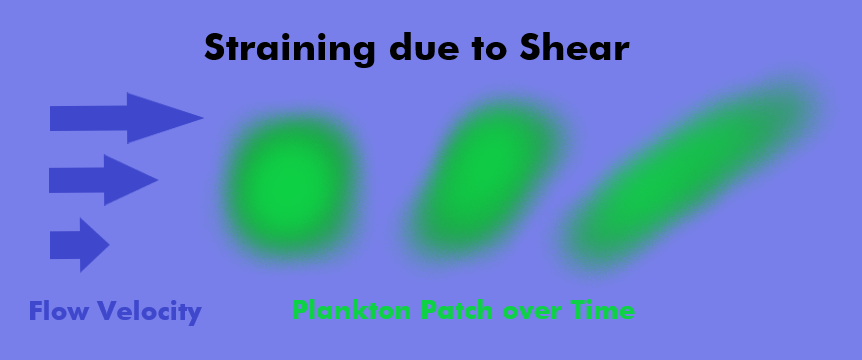
A plankton patch in the ocean being dispersed horizontally due to velocity shear

=== Chemotaxis ===
Motile plankton have been observed to be able to detect and swim towards higher nutrient concentrations and/or light intensities. This mechanism is called chemotaxis and is partly responsible for the formation of thin layers at depths where nutrients are abundant. Another mechanism specific to dinoflagellates is called helical klinotaxis where the algal cell's ability to respond to both positive and negative chemosensory signals is crucial to their motility. If dinoflagellates were not capable of both positive and negative chemotaxis, they would not navigate successfully due to the nature of the transverse and longitudinal flagella causing rotating and translating motions, respectively.

=== Eddies, Filaments, and Fronts ===
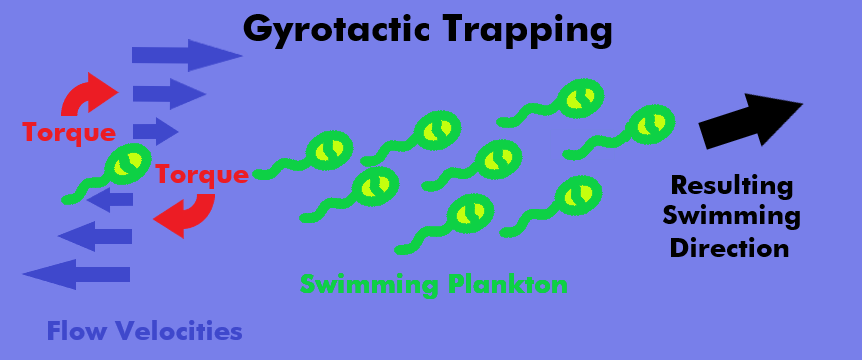
Gyrotactic trapping of swimming plankton due to sharp changes in flow velocities in the ocean.

Another obvious cause of thin layers is the horizontal transport of waters with high plankton concentration into waters with lower concentrations. In this case, upwelled intrusions of nutrient-rich slope water are suggested to be the cause of algal blooms and some thin layers. However, thin layers have been observed to form at the boundaries of more complex fluid mechanisms such as eddies, filaments, and fronts. These thin layers were located at the transition layer, a region of maximum shear and stratification at the base of the mixed layer.

=== Straining by Shear ===
A fluid mechanism that contributes to the formation of thin layers is the straining of fluid by the sheared velocity profile which causes the fluid to tilt and disperse horizontally. If a patch of plankton is located at the fluid being sheared, a thin layer could be formed by the straining of the patch by velocity shear. The four phases of plankton distributions caused by straining are: 1) tilting, 2) shear-thinning, 3) decay, and 4) shear-dispersion (dissipation).

=== Gyrotactic Trapping ===
A sharp change in flow velocities can also prevent some motile plankton from orienting themselves or swimming vertically. This fluid mechanism is called gyrotactic trapping.

== See also ==
- Algal bloom
- Chemotaxis
- Dinoflagellate
- Halocline
- Karenia brevis
- Phytoplankton
- Pycnocline
- Red tide
- Thermocline
- Zooplankton
