= Pycnocline =

Layer where the density gradient is greatest within a body of water

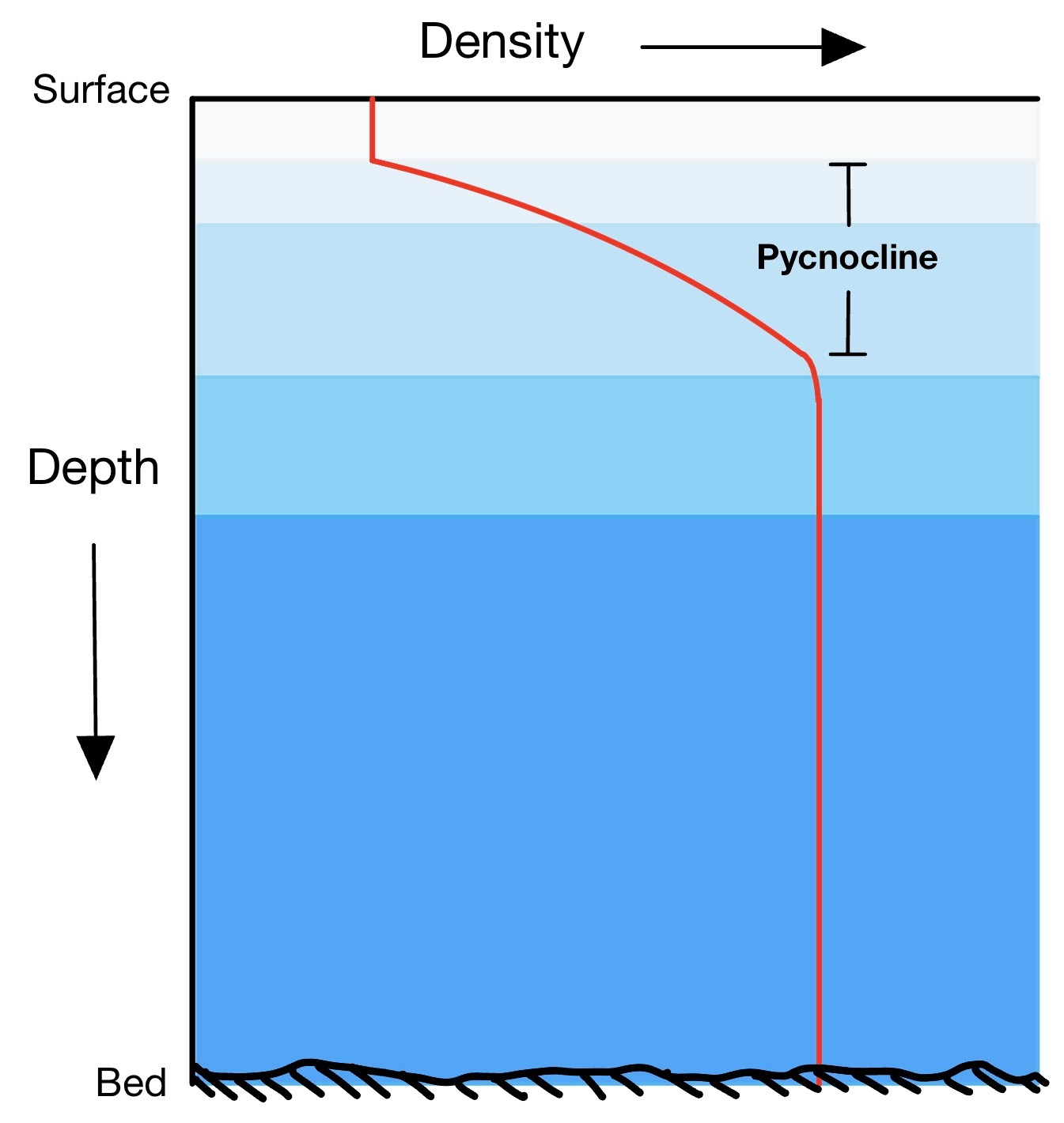
Pycnocline during stable stratification of deep water layers. The pycnocline is the transitory region between a surface layer of water (warmer and less dense) and deeper layer of water (colder and more dense). Mixing occurs across the pycnocline, driven primarily by waves and shear.

A pycnocline is the cline or layer where the density gradient (∂ρ/∂z) is greatest within a body of water. An ocean current is generated by the forces such as breaking waves, temperature and salinity differences, wind, Coriolis effect, and tides caused by the gravitational pull of celestial bodies. In addition, the physical properties in a pycnocline driven by density gradients also affect the flows and vertical profiles in the ocean. These changes can be connected to the transport of heat, salt, and nutrients through the ocean, and the pycnocline diffusion controls upwelling.

Below the mixed layer, a stable density gradient (or pycnocline) separates the upper and lower water, hindering vertical transport. This separation has important biological effects on the ocean and the marine living organisms. However, vertical mixing across a pycnocline is a regular phenomenon in oceans, and occurs through shear-produced turbulence. Such mixing plays a key role in the transport of nutrients.

== Physical function ==
Turbulent mixing produced by winds and waves transfers heat downward from the surface. In low and mid-latitudes, this creates a surface-mixed layer of water of almost uniform temperature which may be a few meters deep to several hundred meters deep. Below this mixed layer, at depths of 200–300 m in the open ocean, the temperature begins to decrease rapidly down to about 1000 m. The water layer within which the temperature gradient is steepest is known as the permanent thermocline. The temperature difference through this layer may be as large as 20 °C, depending on latitude. The permanent thermocline coincides with a change in water density between the warmer, low-density surface waters and the underlying cold dense bottom waters. The region of rapid density change is known as the pycnocline, and it acts as a barrier to vertical water circulation; thus it also affects the vertical distribution of certain chemicals which play a role in the biology of the seas. The sharp gradients in temperature and density also may act as a restriction to vertical movements of animals.

=== Seasonality ===
While the general structure of a pycnocline explained above holds true, pycnoclines can change based on the season. In the winter, sea surface temperatures are cooler, and waves tend to be larger, which increases the depth of the mixed layer even down to the main thermocline/pycnocline in some cases.

In the summer, warmer temperatures, melting sea and land ice, and increased sunlight cause the surface layer of the ocean to increase in temperature. This layer sits on top of the large winter mixed layer that was previously created and forms a seasonal pycnocline above the main pycnocline, with the winter mixed layer becoming a lower density gradient called a pycnostad. As the seasons begin to change again, a net loss of heat from the surface layer and continued wind mixing wear away the seasonal pycnocline until the next summer.

=== Changes with Latitude ===
While temperature and salinity both have an impact on density, one can have a greater effect than the other depending on latitudinal region. In the tropics and mid-latitudes, the surface density for all oceans follows surface temperature rather than surface salinity. At the highest latitudes over 50°, surface density follows salinity more than temperature for all oceans because temperature consistently sits near the freezing point.

In low and mid-latitudes, a permanent pycnocline exists at depths between 200 and 1000 m. In some large but geographically restricted subtropical regions such as the Sargasso Sea in the Atlantic, two permanent thermoclines exist with a layer of lower vertical stratification called a thermostad separating them. This phenomenon is reflected in density due to the strong dependence of density on ocean temperature; two permanent pycnoclines are associated with the permanent thermoclines, and the density equivalent to the thermostad is called the pycnostad.

In subpolar and polar regions, the surface waters are much colder year-round due to latitude and much fresher due to the melting of sea and land ice, high precipitation, and freshwater runoff, while deeper waters are fairly consistent across the globe. Due to this, there is no permanent thermocline present, but seasonal thermoclines can occur. In these areas, a permanent halocline exists, and this halocline is the main factor in determining the permanent pycnocline.

== Biological function ==
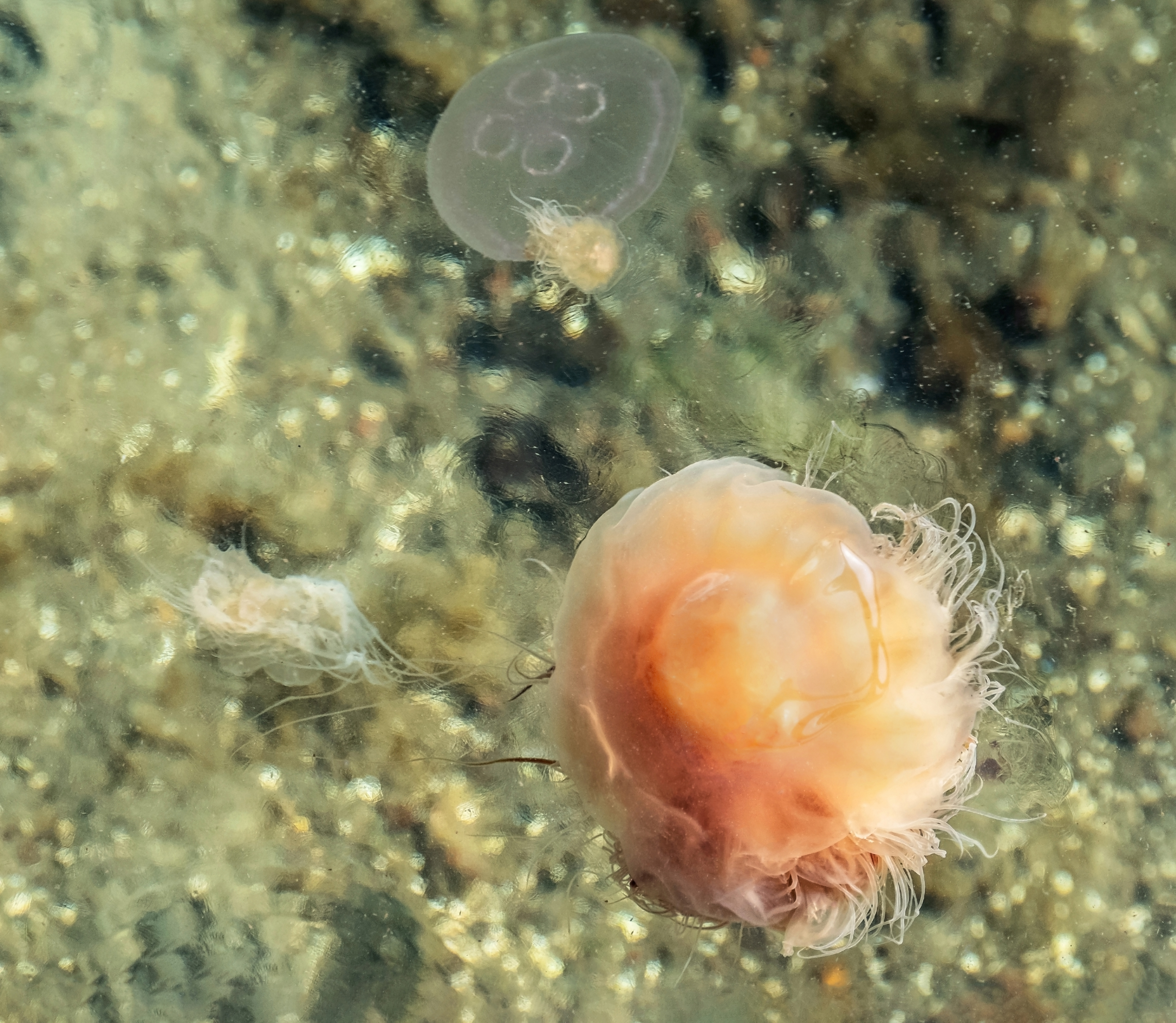
Lion's manes and a moon jellyfish disturbing the pycnocline in the top water layer of Gullmarn fjord, Sweden. The top of the largest jellyfish is breaching the surface, while its tentacles are stirring up the thin pycnocline layer.

Growth rate of phytoplankton is controlled by the nutrient concentration, and the regeneration of nutrients in the sea is a very important part of the interaction between higher and lower trophic levels. The separation due to the pycnocline formation prevents the supply of nutrients from the lower layer into the upper layer. Nutrient fluxes through the pycnocline are lower than at other surface layers.

=== Microbial loop ===
The microbial loop is a trophic pathway in the marine microbial food web. The term "microbial loop" was coined by Azam et al. (1983) to describe the role played by microbes in the marine ecosystem carbon and nutrient cycles where dissolved organic carbon (DOC) is returned to higher trophic levels via the incorporation into bacterial biomass, and also coupled with the classic food chain formed by phytoplankton-zooplankton-nekton.

At the end of phytoplankton bloom, when the algae enter a senescent stage, there is an accumulation of phytodetritus and an increased release of dissolved metabolites. It is particularly at this time that the bacteria can utilize these energy sources to multiply and produce a sharp pulse (or bloom) that follows the phytoplankton bloom. The same relationship between phytoplankton and bacteria influences the vertical distribution of bacterioplankton. Maximum numbers of bacteria generally occur at the pycnocline, where phytodetritus accumulates by sinking from the overlying euphotic zone. There, decomposition by bacteria contributes to the formation of oxygen minimum layers in stable waters.

=== Diel vertical migration ===
One of the most characteristic behavioural features of plankton is a vertical migration that occurs with a 24-hour periodicity. This has often been referred to as diurnal or diel vertical migration. The vertical distance travelled over 24 hours varies, generally being greater among larger species and better swimmers. But even small copepods may migrate several hundred meters twice in a 24-hour period, and stronger swimmers like euphausiids and pelagic shrimp may travel 800 m or more. The depth range of migration may be inhibited by the presence of a thermocline or pycnocline. However, phytoplankton and zooplankton capable of diel vertical migration are often concentrated in the pycnocline. Furthermore, those marine organisms with swimming skills through thermocline or pycnocline may experience strong temperature and density gradients, as well as considerable pressure changes during the migration.

== Stability ==
Pycnoclines become unstable when their Richardson number drops below 0.25. The Richardson number is a dimensionless value expressing the ratio of potential to kinetic energy. This ratio drops below 0.25 when the shear rate exceeds stratification. This can produce Kelvin-Helmholtz instability, resulting in a turbulence which leads to mixing.

The changes in pycnocline depth or properties can be simulated from some computer program models. The simple approach for those models is to examine the Ekman pumping model based on the ocean general circulation model (OCGM).

== Types of clines ==
- Thermocline - A cline based on difference in water temperature.
- Chemocline - A cline based on difference in water chemistry.
- Halocline - A cline based on difference in water salinity.
- Lutocline - A cline based on difference in water turbidity.

== See also ==
- Isopycnal
- Oceanography
- Thin layers (oceanography)
