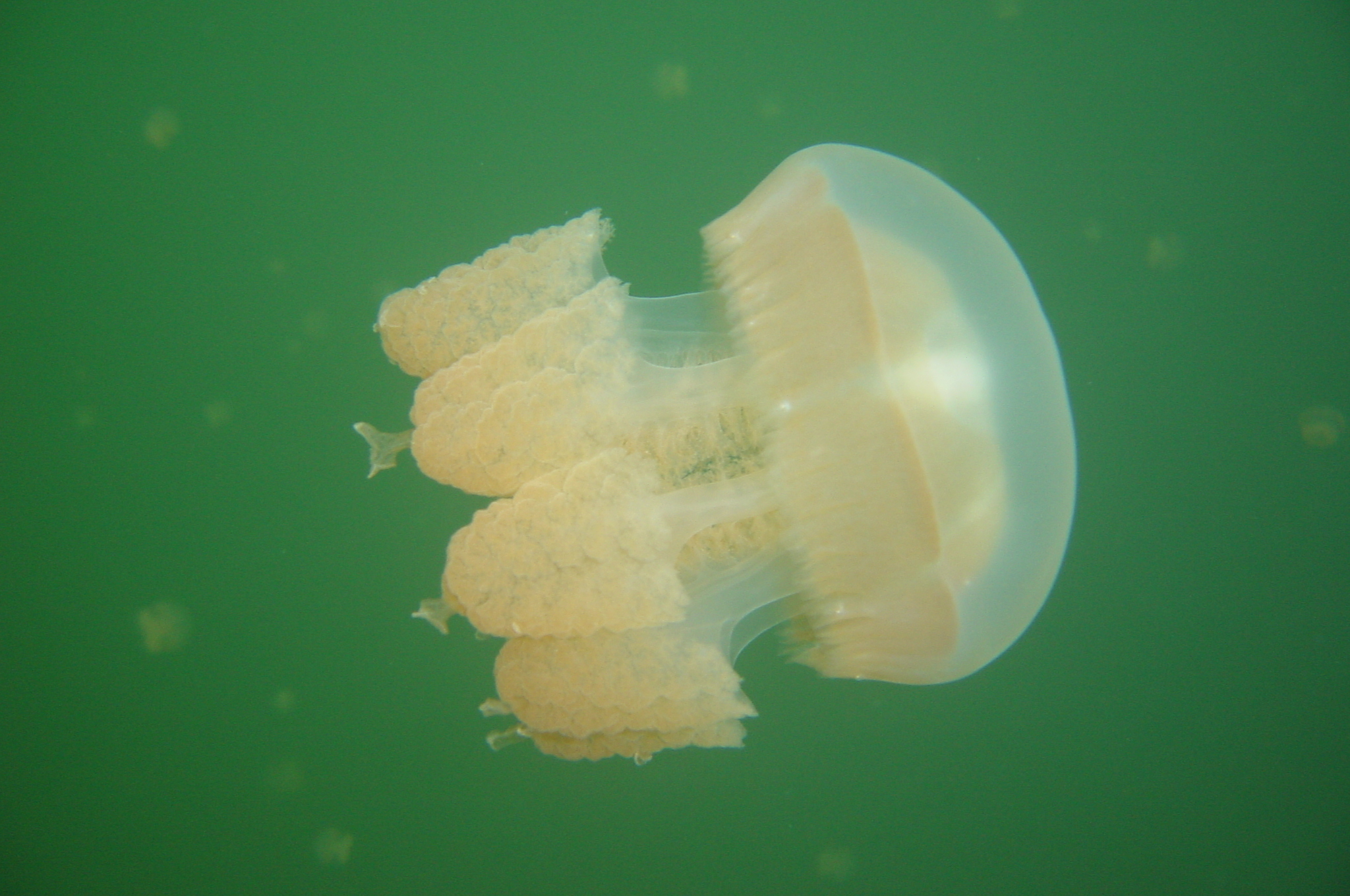

Scientific classification
- Kingdom: Animalia
- Phylum: Cnidaria
- Class: Scyphozoa
- Order: Rhizostomeae
- Family: Mastigiidae
- Genus: Mastigias
- Species: M. papua
- Subspecies: M. p. etpisoni

Trinomial name
- Mastigias papua etpisoni Dawson, 2005

= Golden jellyfish =

Subspecies of jellyfish

The golden jellyfish (Mastigias cf. papua etpisoni) is a subspecies of spotted jellyfish (Mastigias papua) that inhabits Jellyfish Lake on Eil Malk island in Palau in the western Pacific Ocean. Like the nominate subspecies, it derives part of its nutrition from symbiotic algae (Zooxanthellae) that live in their tissues and part of their nutrition from captured zooplankton.

The golden jellyfish is morphologically, physiologically, and behaviourally distinct from the spotted jellyfish. It was described as a separate subspecies in 2011, together with four other new subspecies inhabiting nearby marine lakes. The species identification is uncertain (denoted by cf. in the name) because the individuals local to Palauan lagoons may be only one of several cryptic species that make up the M. papua group. It is distinguished by the almost complete loss of spots on the exumbrella and the almost complete loss of their clubs, an appendage attached to the oral arms.

== Ecology ==
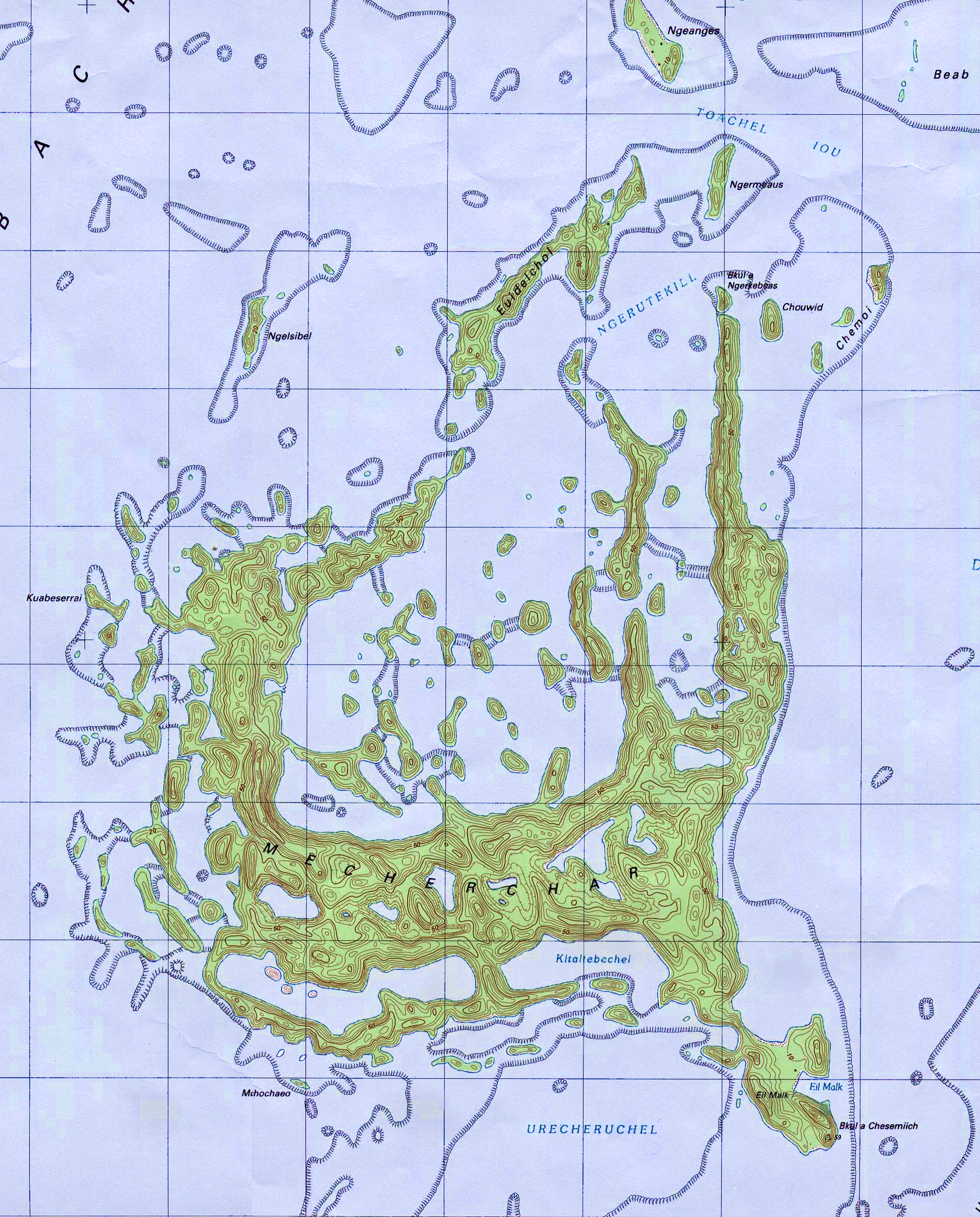
Map of Eil Malk with Jellyfish Lake in the eastern part of the main island

The subspecies carries out well-characterized daily migrations that are driven by light conditions in the lake.

From 1998 onwards, a steep decline in the golden jellyfish medusa population was detected in Jellyfish Lake. By December 1998, the medusa population had declined to zero. This was followed by a resurgence in 2000, and the population had returned to pre-decline levels in 2012. This was apparently caused by a die-off of the symbiotic zooxanthellae due to increased water temperatures during an El Niño weather event.
