= Ongael =

Island in Koror, Palau

Ongael Island
- Location within Palau

Geography
- Location: Pacific Ocean
- Coordinates: 7°15′26″N 134°22′57″E
- Archipelago: Rock Islands

Administration
- Palau
- State: Koror

Ongael Island is an island in Koror State, Palau. It is the location of the famous Ongael Lake.
