= Eil Malk =

Island in Palau

Eil Malk (Mecherchar)
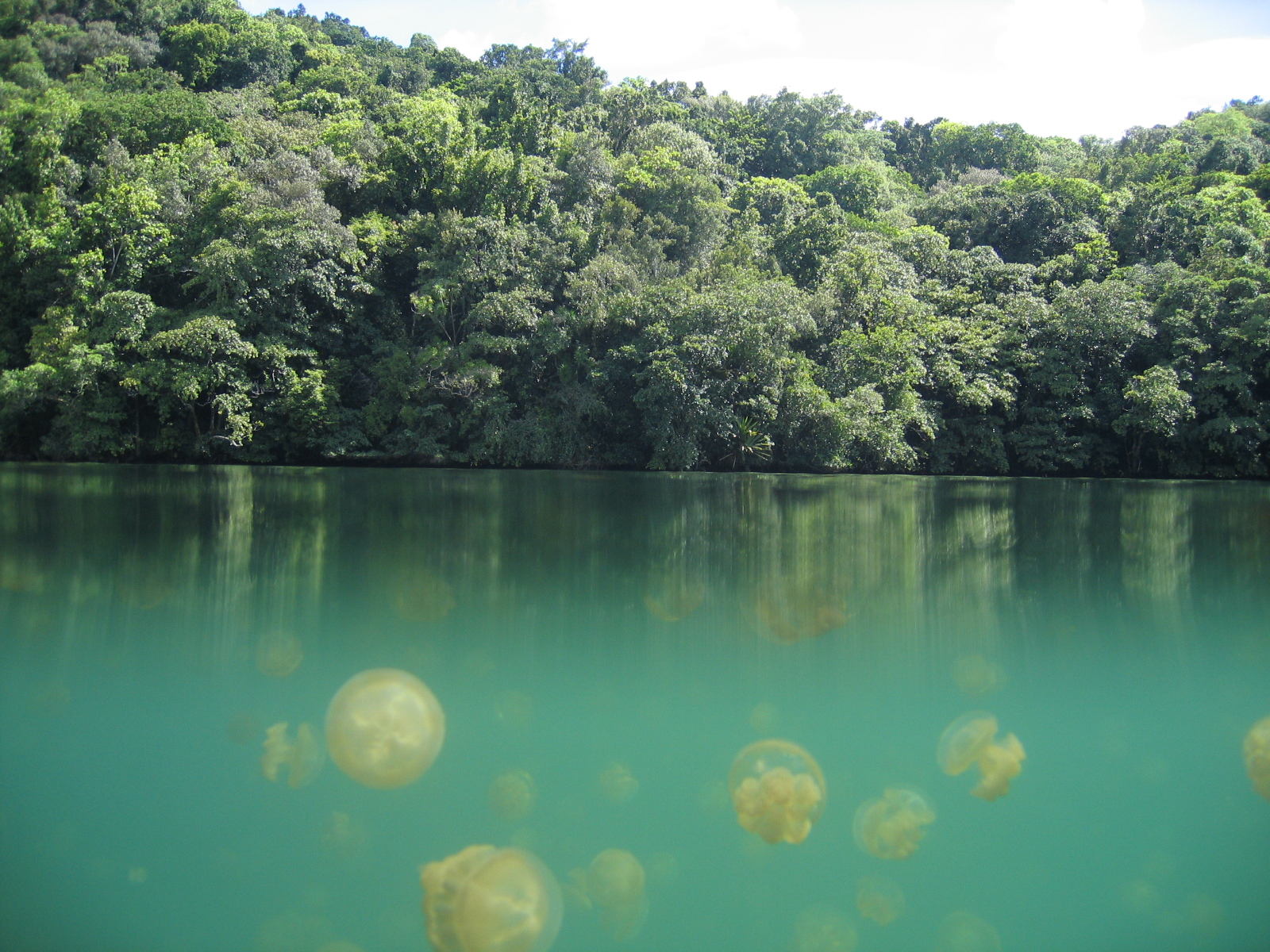
- Jellyfish Lake on Eil Malk

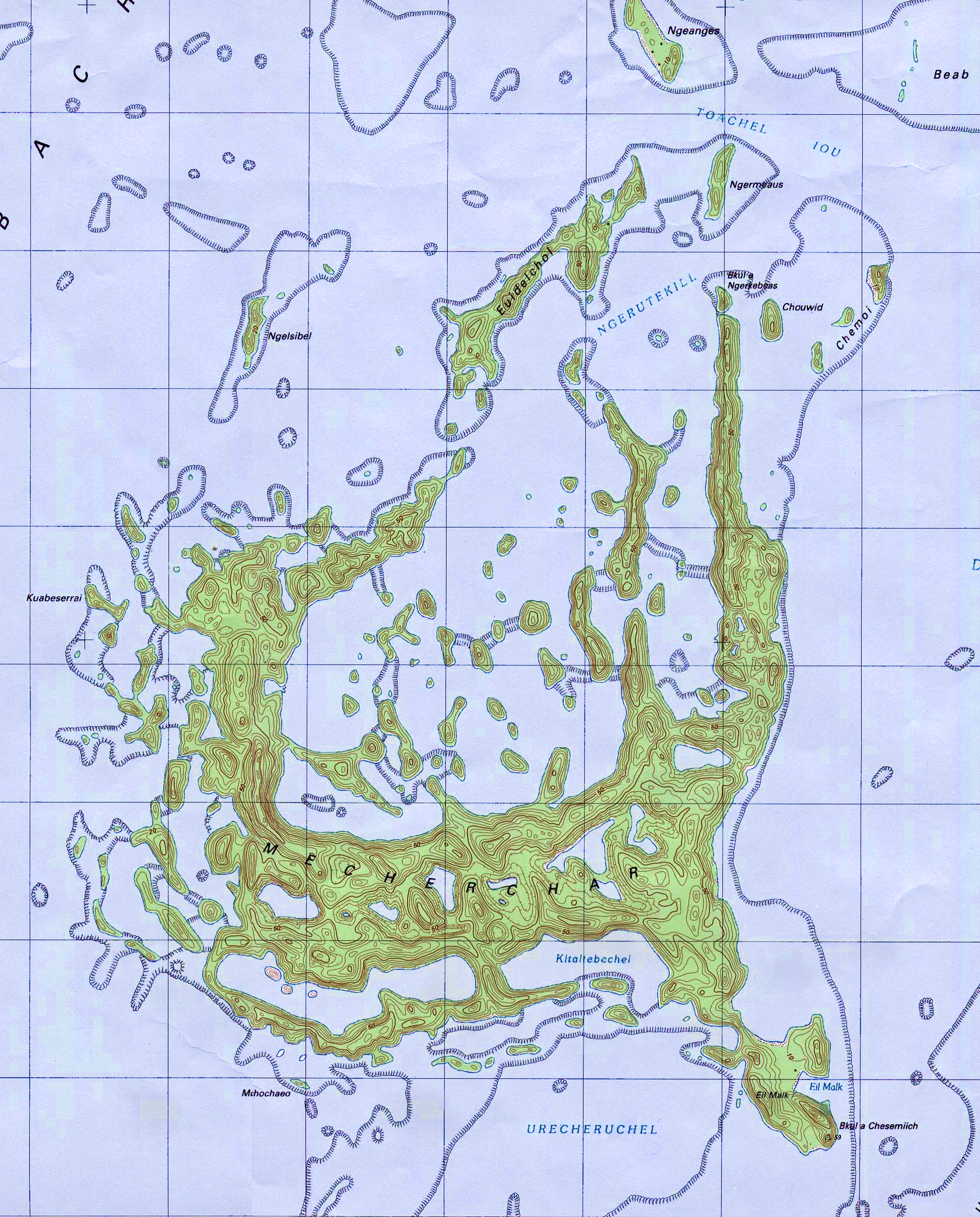
- Map of Eil Malk

- Location within Palau

Geography
- Location: Pacific Ocean
- Coordinates: 7°9′15″N 134°21′45″E
- Archipelago: Mecherchar Islands, Palau Islands
- Area: 19 km^{2} (7.3 sq mi)
- Length: 6 km (3.7 mi)
- Width: 4.5 km (2.8 mi)
- Highest elevation: 82 m (269 ft)

Administration
- Palau
- State: Koror
- Unincorporated area: Rock Islands

Demographics
- Population: 0
- Pop. density: 0/km^{2} (0/sq mi)

Eil Malk or Mecherchar is the main island of the Mecherchar Islands, an island group of Palau in the Pacific Ocean. In a more narrow sense, just the southeastern peninsula of Mecherchar is called Eil Malk.

== Geography ==
Eil Malk is located 23 kilometres (14 mi) southwest of Koror near the fringing reef of Palau. The neighboring island is Ngeruktabel.

This densely wooded, Y-shaped island is up to 6 kilometres (3.7 mi) long and 4.5 kilometres (2.8 mi) wide. There are more than 10 small lakes on the island, including Clear Lake and the most well-known, Jellyfish Lake, located in the eastern part of the island.

== Governance ==
Eil Malk is uninhabited, but there were at least one, and up to three, villages located there between 1200 and 1450.

== See also ==
- Desert island – Island without human residents
- List of islands
