= Halocline =

Stratification of a body of water due to salinity differences

A halocline (or salinity chemocline), from the Greek words hals (salt) and klinein (to slope), refers to a layer within a body of water (water column) where there is a sharp change in salinity (salt concentration) with depth.

Haloclines are typically found in oceans or large estuaries and it is a type of chemical stratification that is most commonly found in places where freshwater from rivers or melting ice, mixes with salty ocean water.

== Description ==
In the midlatitudes, an excess of evaporation over precipitation leads to surface waters being saltier than deep waters. In such regions, the vertical stratification is due to surface waters being warmer than deep waters and the effect of the halocline is destabilizing. Such regions may be prone to salt fingering, a process which results in the preferential mixing of salinity.

In these regions, the halocline is important in allowing for the formation of sea ice, and limiting the escape of carbon dioxide to the atmosphere.

In certain high latitude regions (such as the Arctic Ocean, Bering Sea, and the Southern Ocean) the surface waters are actually colder than the deep waters and the halocline is responsible for maintaining water column stability, isolating the surface waters from the deep waters.

Haloclines are also found in fjords, and poorly mixed estuaries where fresh water is deposited at the ocean surface.

A halocline can be easily created and observed in a drinking glass or other clear vessel. If fresh water is slowly poured over a quantity of salt water, using a spoon held horizontally at water-level to prevent mixing, a hazy interface layer, the halocline, will soon be visible due to the varying index of refraction across the boundary.

A halocline is most commonly confused with a thermocline – a thermocline is an area within a body of water that marks a drastic change in temperature. A halocline can coincide with a thermocline and form a pycnocline.

Haloclines are common in water-filled limestone caves near the ocean. Less dense fresh water from the land forms a layer over salt water from the ocean. For underwater cave explorers, this can cause the optical illusion of air space in caverns. Passing through the halocline tends to stir up the layers.

Plot of temperature and salinity in the Arctic Ocean at 85,18 north and 117,28 east dated Jan. 1st 2010.

== Movement of the halocline ==
The location (depth of upper limit) of the halocline is dependent upon ocean circulation, water sources, and atmospheric conditions. Changes in the halocline's position and strength can significantly impact ocean mixing, nutrient transport, and hypoxia levels in bottom waters. In each ocean, its water sources impact the advection of saline which is responsible for transforming into the halocline layers through means such as ice melting and surface cooling. Winds and river runoff can also impose variations on the depth and stability of the halocline.

== Salinity and density ==
Salinity is directly responsible for density distribution and stratification within the ocean (as seen in the pycnocline). This stratification is necessary for the formation of sea ice for example in high-latitude oceans the halocline prevents warm saline Atlantic waters from mixing with the cold surface layer allowing for ice growth. The Arctic halocline has a distinct low-salinity layer that limits deep convection and maintains the stability of the water column. Conversely, there are places (like the Baltic Sea) where the halocline depth and salinity are affected by river runoff. Here fresh water is introduced into the upper layers and mixed by wind which influences density gradients and deepwater ventilation.

== Global and regional halocline depths ==
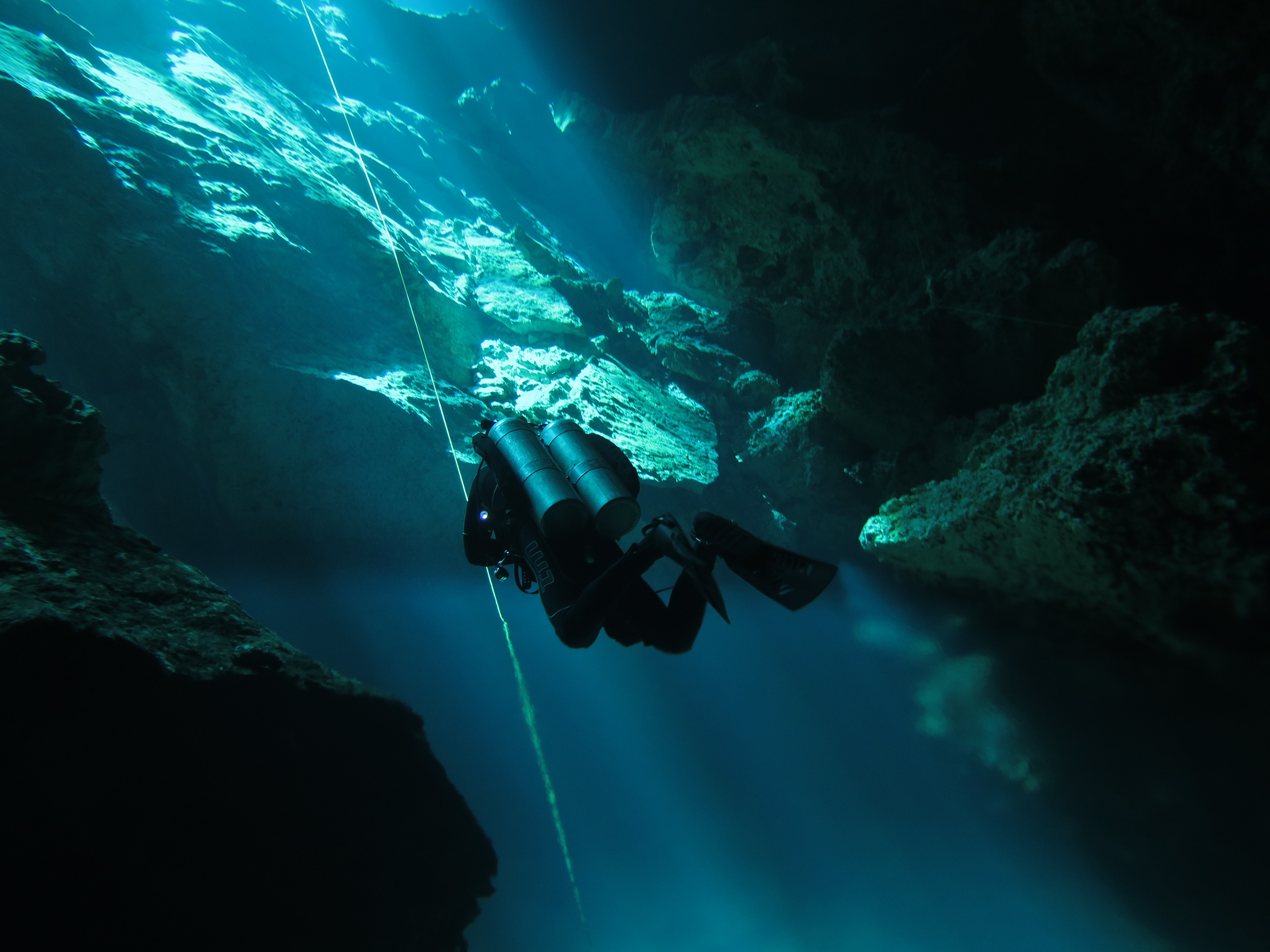
Halocline visible at the cenote Chac Mool, Mexico. The freshwater lies above the denser saltwater. In this photo, the visible water distortion from the halocline can be seen below the diver. Note how the appearance of the safety line below the diver becomes extremely blurred by the increase in salinity

Global and regional differences in salinity, circulation, and temperature result in halocline depth variations of the different oceans. In the Arctic Ocean, the halocline is between 50 and 250 m (160 and 820 ft) deep. This can vary depending on whether the source water comes from the Atlantic or Pacific. On a global scale, haloclines are common in areas with low surface salinity, such as the tropics and subpolar regions. In shallow seas (like the Baltic) halocline depths range from 60 to 80 m (200 to 260 ft), but they exhibit significant variability due to annual changes in wind forcing and river discharge.

== Other types of clines ==
- Thermocline – A cline based on difference in water temperature,
- Chemocline – A cline based on difference in water chemistry,
- Pycnocline – A cline based on difference in water density.

== See also ==
- Hypersaline lake – Landlocked body of water that contains concentrations of salts greater than the sea
- Isopycnal – Line connecting points of a specific density or potential density
- Osmotic power – Sustainable energy from sea and river water
- Thermohaline circulation – Part of large-scale ocean circulation
- Thin layers (oceanography)
