= Thermal bar =

Hydrodynamic feature

A thermal bar is a hydrodynamic feature that forms around the edges of holomictic lakes during the seasonal transition to stratified conditions, due to the shorter amount of time required for shallow areas of the lake to stratify.

== Description ==
During the process of lake stratification, shallow areas generally become stratified before deeper areas. In large lakes this condition may persist for weeks, during which a temperature front known as a thermal bar forms between the stratified and unstratified areas of the lake. The thermal bar generally forms parallel to shore and moves toward the lake center as deeper areas of the lake stratify. While thermal bars can form in both fall and spring, most studies of the thermal bar have investigated aspects of the feature in the spring, when the lake is warming up and the summer thermocline is beginning to form.

At the lake surface, the thermal bar may be visible as a foam line between the stratified water shoreward of the thermal bar and unstratified water on the offshore side. At this convergence, waters mix and sink when they reach the temperature of maximum density, roughly 4 degrees Celsius for freshwater, a process known as cabbeling.

The downwelling of dense water at the thermal bar acts as a barrier to horizontal mixing. In spring, this concentrates warm water and suspended materials in the near shore waters around the edge of the lake. Satellite imagery has been used to identify thermal bars using their thermal characteristics as well as the concentration of suspended materials on their shoreward side, typically due to surface runoff to the lake.

Isotherms on the stratified side of the thermal bar slope away from the bar, producing a pressure gradient force that when balanced by the Coriolis force produces a cyclonic coastal geostrophic current that transports water and suspended matter along the shore.

The thermal bar phenomena was first described by François-Alphonse Forel in his study of Lac Leman. Additional studies have been carried out in Lake Ladoga, Lake Baikal and the Great Lakes.

== Ecological significance ==
Although a temporary seasonal feature, the thermal bar plays an important role in lake ecology by restricting mixing between coastal and offshore waters. This role is particularly evident during the spring runoff period when the retention of coastal waters may benefit aquatic organisms by providing warmer water temperatures and elevated nutrient concentrations, or may threaten coastal environments by retaining pollutants in coastal waters.

== See also ==
- Water (molecule)#Density of water and ice
- Limnology
- Water
- Aquatic ecology

== Additional references ==
- Paul R. Holland and Anthony Kay, “A review of the physics and ecological implications of the thermal bar circulation,” Limnologica - Ecology and Management of Inland Waters 33, no. 3 (September 2003): 153–162.
- C. H. Mortimer, “Lake hydrodynamics." Mitt. Int, Ver. Limnol 20 (1974): 124–197.
- F. Peeters and R. Kipfer, “Currents in Stratified Water Bodies 1: Density-Driven Flows,” in Encyclopedia of Inland Waters (Oxford: Academic Press, 2009), 530–538.
