= Stratification (water) =

Layering of a body of water due to density variations

Lake stratification is one example of stratification in water bodies: Lakes are stratified into three separate sections: I. The Epilimnion II. The Metalimnion III. The Hypolimnion

Stratification in water is the formation in a body of water of relatively distinct and stable layers by density. It occurs in all water bodies where there is stable density variation with depth. Stratification is a barrier to the vertical mixing of water, which affects the exchange of heat, carbon, oxygen and nutrients. Wind-driven upwelling and downwelling of open water can induce mixing of different layers through the stratification, and force the rise of denser cold, nutrient-rich, or saline water and the sinking of lighter warm or fresher water, respectively. Layers are based on water density: denser water remains below less dense water in stable stratification in the absence of forced mixing.

Stratification occurs in several kinds of water bodies, such as oceans, lakes, estuaries, flooded caves, aquifers and some rivers.

== Mechanism ==
The driving force in stratification is gravity, which sorts adjacent arbitrary volumes of water by local density, operating on them by buoyancy and weight. A volume of water of lower density than the surroundings will have a resultant buoyant force lifting it upwards, and a volume with higher density will be pulled down by the weight which will be greater than the resultant buoyant forces, following Archimedes' principle. Each volume will rise or sink until it has either mixed with its surroundings through turbulence and diffusion to match the density of the surroundings, reaches a depth where it has the same density as the surroundings, or reaches the top or bottom boundary of the body of water, and spreads out until the forces are balanced and the body of water reaches its lowest potential energy.

The density of water, which is defined as mass per unit of volume, is a function of temperature ($T$), salinity ($S$) and pressure ($p$), which is a function of depth and the density distribution of the overlaying water column, and is denoted as $\rho(S, T, p)$.

The dependence on pressure is not significant, since water is almost perfectly incompressible. Since water is typically densest at 4 °C, an increase in the temperature of the water above that temperature causes expansion and the density will decrease. A decrease in temperature below 4 °C also causes slight expansion and water expands the most when it freezes, resulting in a decrease in density. An increase in salinity, the mass of dissolved solids, will also increase the density.

Density is the decisive factor in stratification. It is possible for a combination of temperature and salinity to result in a density that is less or more than the effect of either one in isolation, so it can happen that a layer of warmer saline water is layered between a colder fresher surface layer and a colder more saline deeper layer.

A pycnocline is a layer in a body of water where the change in density is relatively large compared to that of other layers. The thickness of the pycnocline is not constant everywhere and depends on a variety of variables.

Just like a pycnocline is a layer with a large change in density with depth, similar layers can be defined for a large change in temperature, a thermocline, and salinity, a halocline. Since the density depends on both the temperature and the salinity, the pycno-, thermo-, and haloclines have a similar shape.

=== Mixing ===
Mixing is the breakdown of stratification. Once a body of water has reached a stable state of stratification, and no external forces or energy are applied, it will slowly mix by diffusion until homogeneous in density, temperature and composition, varying only due to minor effects of compressibility. This does not usually occur in nature, where there are a variety of external influences to maintain or disturb the equilibrium. Among these are heat input from the sun, which warms the upper volume, making it expand slightly and decreasing the density, so this tends to increase or stabilise stratification. Heat input from below, as occurs from tectonic plate spreading and vulcanism is a disturbing influence, causing heated water to rise, but these are usually local effects and small compared to the effects of wind, heat loss and evaporation from the free surface, and changes of direction of currents.

Wind has the effects of generating wind waves and wind currents, and increasing evaporation at the surface, which has a cooling effect and a concentrating effect on solutes, increasing salinity, both of which increase density. The movement of waves creates some shear in the water, which increases mixing in the surface water, as does the development of currents. Mass movement of water between latitudes is affected by coriolis forces, which impart motion across the current direction, and movement towards or away from a land mass or other topographic obstruction may leave a deficit or excess which lowers or raises the sea level locally, driving upwelling and downwelling to compensate. The major upwellings in the ocean are associated with the divergence of currents that bring deeper waters to the surface. There are at least five types of upwelling: coastal upwelling, large-scale wind-driven upwelling in the ocean interior, upwelling associated with eddies, topographically associated upwelling, and broad-diffusive upwelling in the ocean interior. Downwelling also occurs in anti-cyclonic regions of the ocean where warm rings spin clockwise, causing surface convergence. When these surface waters converge, the surface water is pushed downwards. These mixing effects destabilise and reduce stratification.

== By water body type ==
=== Oceans ===
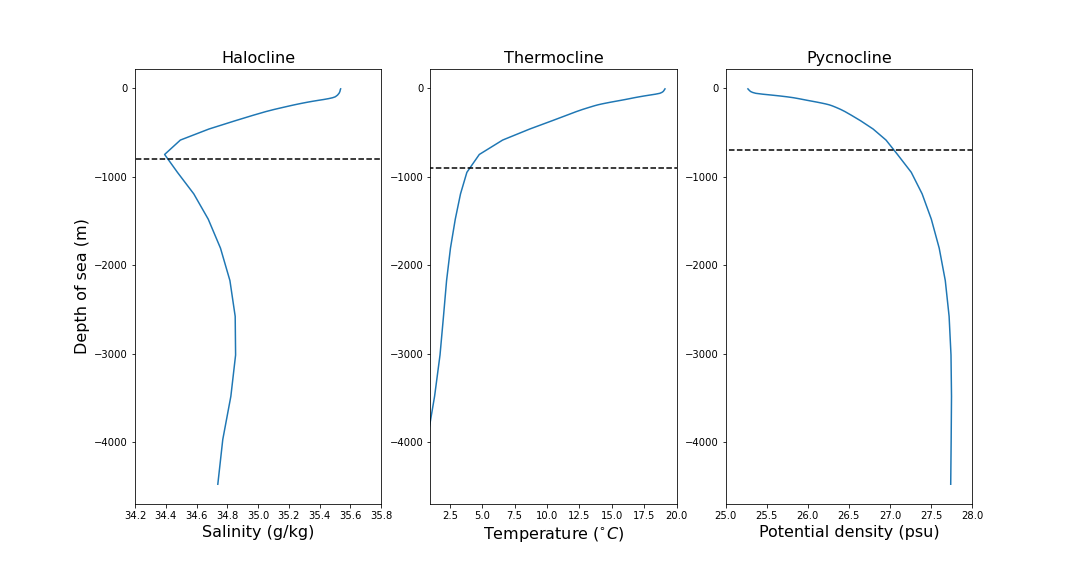
The halo-, thermo-, and pycnocline at 10E, 30S. For this image the annual means of the year 2000 from the GODAS Data has been used.

Ocean stratification is the natural separation of an ocean's water into horizontal layers by density, and occurs in all ocean basins. Denser water is below lighter water, representing a stable stratification. The pycnocline is the layer where the rate of change in density is largest.

Ocean stratification is generally stable because warmer water is less dense than colder water, and most heating is from the sun, which directly affects only the surface layer. Stratification is reduced by mechanical mixing induced by wind, but reinforced by convection (warm water rising, cold water sinking). Stratified layers act as a barrier to the mixing of water, which impacts the exchange of heat, carbon, oxygen and other nutrients. The surface mixed layer is the uppermost layer in the ocean and is well mixed by mechanical (wind) and thermal (convection) effects.

Due to wind driven movement of surface water away from and towards land masses, upwelling and downwelling can occur, breaking through the stratification in those areas, where cold nutrient-rich water rises and warm water sinks, respectively, mixing surface and bottom waters.

The thickness of the thermocline is not constant everywhere and depends on a variety of variables.

Between 1960 and 2018, upper ocean stratification increased between 0.7 and 1.2% per decade due to climate change. This means that the differences in density of the layers in the oceans increase, leading to larger mixing barriers and other effects. Global upper-ocean stratification has continued its increasing trend in 2022. The southern oceans (south of 30°S) experienced the strongest rate of stratification since 1960, followed by the Pacific, Atlantic, and the Indian Oceans. Increasing stratification is predominantly affected by changes in ocean temperature; salinity only plays a role locally.

=== Estuaries ===
An estuary is a partially enclosed coastal body of brackish water with one or more rivers or streams flowing into it, and with a free connection to the open sea.

The residence time of water in an estuary is dependent on the circulation within the estuary that is driven by density differences due to changes in salinity and temperature. Less dense freshwater floats over saline water and warmer water floats above colder water for temperatures greater than 4 °C. As a result, near-surface and near-bottom waters can have different trajectories, resulting in different residence times.

Vertical mixing determines how much the salinity and temperature will change from the top to the bottom, profoundly affecting water circulation. Vertical mixing occurs at three levels: from the surface downward by wind forces, the bottom upward by turbulence generated at the interface between the estuarine and oceanic water masses, and internally by turbulent mixing caused by the water currents which are driven by the tides, wind, and river inflow.

Different types of estuarine circulation result from vertical mixing:

Salt wedge estuaries are characterized by a sharp density interface between the upper layer of freshwater and the bottom layer of saline water. River water dominates in this system, and tidal effects have a small role in the circulation patterns. The freshwater floats on top of the seawater and gradually thins as it moves seaward. The denser seawater moves along the bottom up the estuary forming a wedge shaped layer and becoming thinner as it moves landward. As a velocity difference develops between the two layers, shear forces generate internal waves at the interface, mixing the seawater upward with the freshwater. An example is the Mississippi estuary.

As tidal forcing increases, the control of river flow on the pattern of circulation in the estuary becomes less dominating. Turbulent mixing induced by the current creates a moderately stratified condition. Turbulent eddies mix the water column, creating a mass transfer of freshwater and seawater in both directions across the density boundary. Therefore, the interface separating the upper and lower water masses is replaced with a water column with a gradual increase in salinity from surface to bottom. A two layered flow still exists however, with the maximum salinity gradient at mid depth. Partially stratified estuaries are typically shallow and wide, with a greater width to depth ratio than salt wedge estuaries. An example is the Thames.

In vertically homogeneous estuaries, tidal flow is greater relative to river discharge, resulting in a well mixed water column and the disappearance of the vertical salinity gradient. The freshwater-seawater boundary is eliminated due to the intense turbulent mixing and eddy effects. The width to depth ratio of vertically homogeneous estuaries is large, with the limited depth creating enough vertical shearing on the seafloor to mix the water column completely. If tidal currents at the mouth of an estuary are strong enough to create turbulent mixing, vertically homogeneous conditions often develop.

Fjords are usually examples of highly stratified estuaries; they are basins with sills and have freshwater inflow that greatly exceeds evaporation. Oceanic water is imported in an intermediate layer and mixes with the freshwater. The resulting brackish water is then exported into the surface layer. A slow import of seawater may flow over the sill and sink to the bottom of the fjord (deep layer), where the water remains stagnant until flushed by an occasional storm.

Inverse estuaries occur in dry climates where evaporation greatly exceeds the inflow of freshwater. A salinity maximum zone is formed, and both riverine and oceanic water flow close to the surface towards this zone. This water is pushed downward and spreads along the bottom in both the seaward and landward direction. The maximum salinity can reach extremely high values and the residence time can be several months. In these systems, the salinity maximum zone acts like a plug, inhibiting the mixing of estuarine and oceanic waters so that freshwater does not reach the ocean. The high salinity water sinks seaward and exits the estuary.

=== Lakes ===
Lake stratification, generally a form of thermal stratification caused by density variations due to water temperature, is the formation of separate and distinct layers of water during warm weather, and sometimes when frozen over. Typically stratified lakes show three distinct layers, the epilimnion comprising the top warm layer, the thermocline (or metalimnion): the middle layer, which may change depth throughout the day, and the colder hypolimnion extending to the floor of the lake.

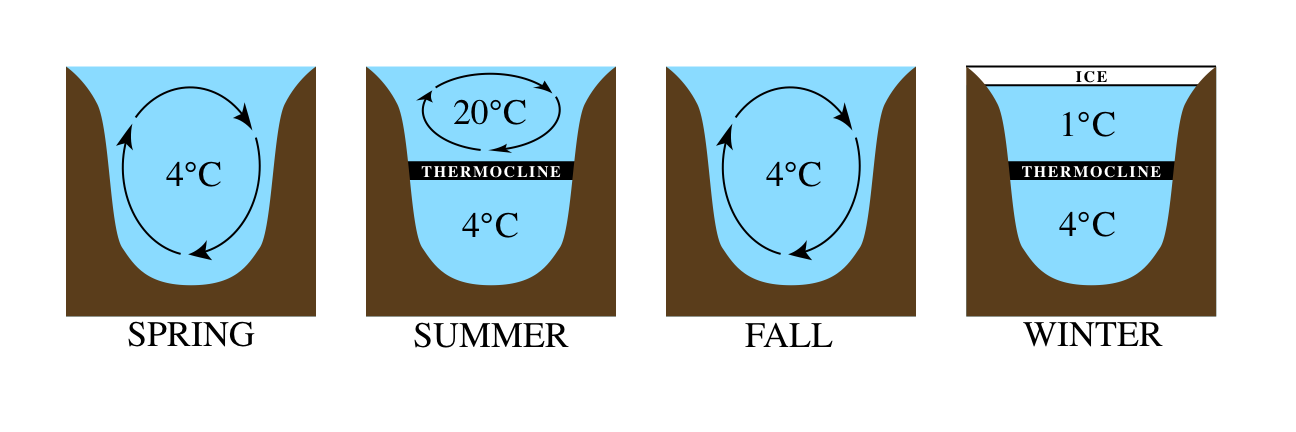
Typical mixing pattern for many lakes, caused by the fact that fresh water has maximum density at 4°C. Lake stratification is stable in summer and winter, becoming unstable in spring and fall when the surface waters cross the 4°C mark.

The thermal stratification of lakes is a vertical isolation of parts of the water body from mixing caused by variation in the temperature at different depths in the lake, and is due to the density of water varying with temperature. Cold water is denser than warm water of the same salinity, and the epilimnion generally consists of water that is not as dense as the water in the hypolimnion. However, the temperature of maximum density for freshwater is 4 °C. In temperate regions where lake water warms up and cools through the seasons, a cyclical pattern of overturn occurs that is repeated from year to year as the water at the top of the lake cools and sinks (see stable and unstable stratification). For example, in dimictic lakes the lake water turns over during the spring and the fall. This process occurs more slowly in deeper water and as a result, a thermal bar may form. If the stratification of water lasts for extended periods, the lake is meromictic.

In shallow lakes, stratification into epilimnion, metalimnion, and hypolimnion often does not occur, as wind or cooling causes regular mixing throughout the year. These lakes are called polymictic. There is not a fixed depth that separates polymictic and stratifying lakes, as apart from depth, this is also influenced by turbidity, lake surface area, and climate. The lake mixing regime (e.g. polymictic, dimictic, meromictic) describes the yearly patterns of lake stratification that occur in most years. However, short-term events can influence lake stratification as well. Heat waves can cause periods of stratification in otherwise mixed, shallow lakes, while mixing events, such as storms or large river discharge, can break down stratification. Recent research suggests that seasonally ice-covered dimictic lakes may be described as "cryostratified" or "cryomictic" according to their wintertime stratification regimes. Cryostratified lakes exhibit inverse stratification near the ice surface and have depth-averaged temperatures near 4 °C, while cryomictic lakes have no under-ice thermocline and have depth-averaged winter temperatures closer to 0 °C.

=== Anchialine systems ===
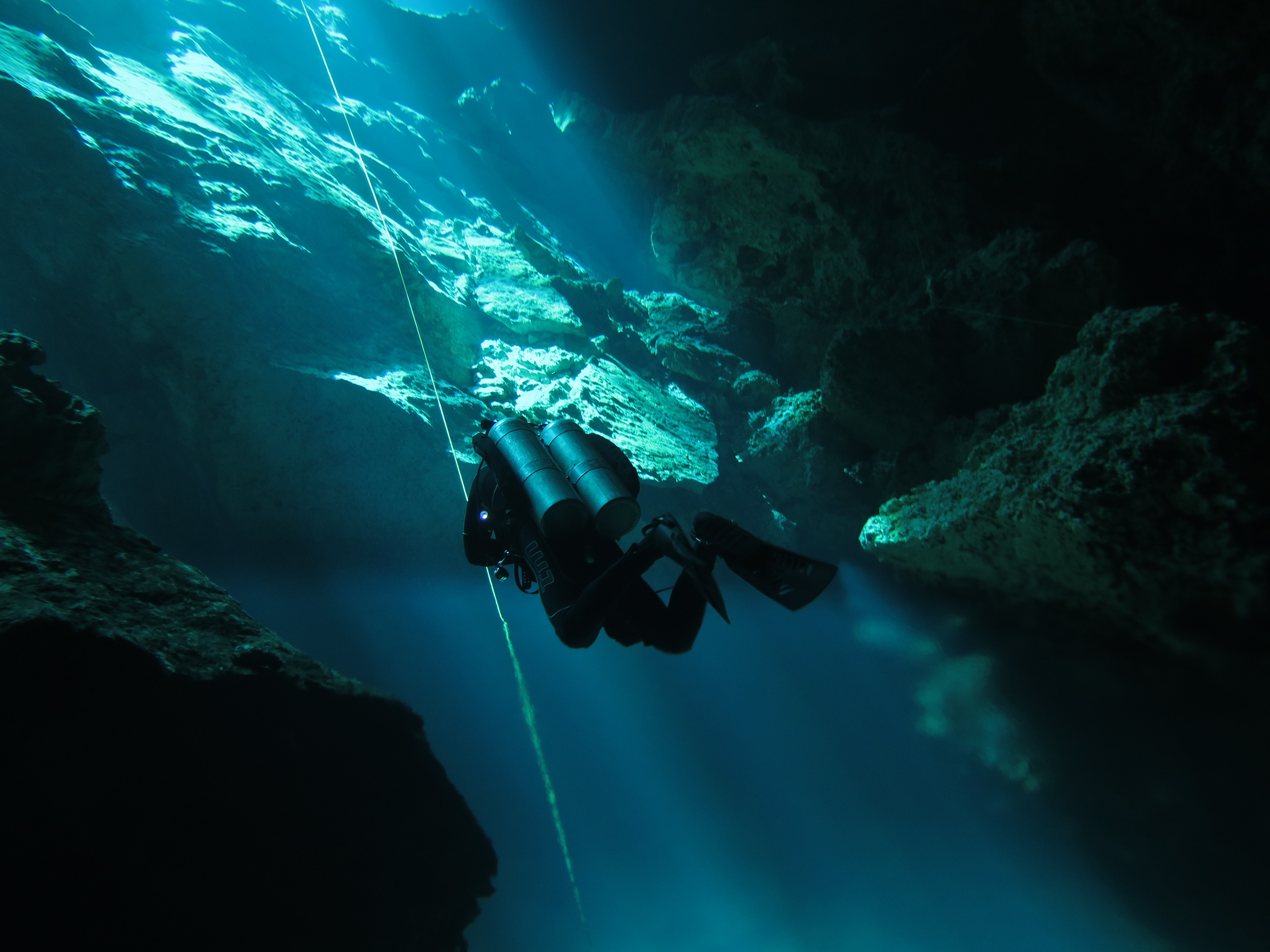
Halocline visible at the cenote Chac Mool, Mexico. The freshwater lies above the denser saltwater. In this photo, the visible water distortion from the halocline can be seen below the diver.

An anchialine system is a landlocked body of water with a subterranean connection to the ocean. Depending on its formation, these systems can exist in one of two primary forms: pools or caves. The primary differentiating characteristics between pools and caves is the availability of light; cave systems are generally aphotic while pools are euphotic. The difference in light availability has a large influence on the biology of a given system. Anchialine systems are a feature of coastal aquifers which are density stratified, with water near the surface being fresh or brackish, and saline water intruding from the coast at depth. Depending on the site, it is sometimes possible to access the deeper saline water directly in the anchialine pool, or sometimes it may be accessible by cave diving.

Anchialine systems are extremely common worldwide especially along neotropical coastlines where the geology and aquifer systems are relatively young, and there is minimal soil development. Such conditions occur notably where the bedrock is limestone or recently formed volcanic lava. Many anchialine systems are found on the coastlines of the island of Hawaii, the Yucatán Peninsula, South Australia, the Canary Islands, Christmas Island, and other karst and volcanic systems.

Karst caves which drain into the sea may have a halocline separating the fresh water from the seawater underneath which can be visible even when both layers are clear due to the difference in refractive indices.
