= Thermostad =

Homogeneous layer of oceanic waters

A thermostad is a homogeneous layer of oceanic waters in terms of temperature, it is defined as a relative minimum of the vertical temperature gradient. The term was coined in 1966 by R. Carlton Seitz, at the time at the Chesapeake Bay Institute of Johns Hopkins University. He proposed it in opposition to a thermocline, in which the thermal gradient is large. The ending "stad" is from the Greek word στάδην meaning "in an upright position", from the root ἵστημι meaning to stand.

The suffix "-stad" is now widely used in oceanography.
