= Chemocline =

Cline caused by a strong, vertical chemistry gradient within a body of water

A chemocline is a type of cline, a layer of fluid with different properties, characterized by a strong, vertical chemistry gradient within a body of water. In bodies of water where chemoclines occur, the cline separates the upper and lower layers, resulting in different properties for those layers. The lower layer shows a change in the concentration of dissolved gases and solids compared to the upper layer.

Chemoclines most commonly occur where local conditions favor the formation of anoxic bottom water — deep water deficient in oxygen, where only anaerobic forms of life can exist. Common anaerobic organisms that live in these conditions include phototrophic purple sulfur bacteria and green sulfur bacteria. The Black Sea is an example of a body of water with a prominent chemocline, though similar bodies (classified as meromictic lakes) exist across the globe. Meromictic lakes are the result of meromixis, which is a circumstance where a body of water does not fully mix and circulate, causing stratification.

In any body of water in which oxygen-rich surface waters are well-mixed (holomictic), no chemocline will exist, as there is no stratification of layers. Chemoclines can become unstable when dissolved gases become supersaturated, such as H_{2}S, due to mixing associated with bubbling or boiling (ebullition).

== Chemocline structure ==
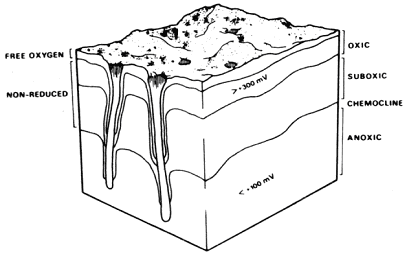
Position of the chemocline between oxic and anoxic layers

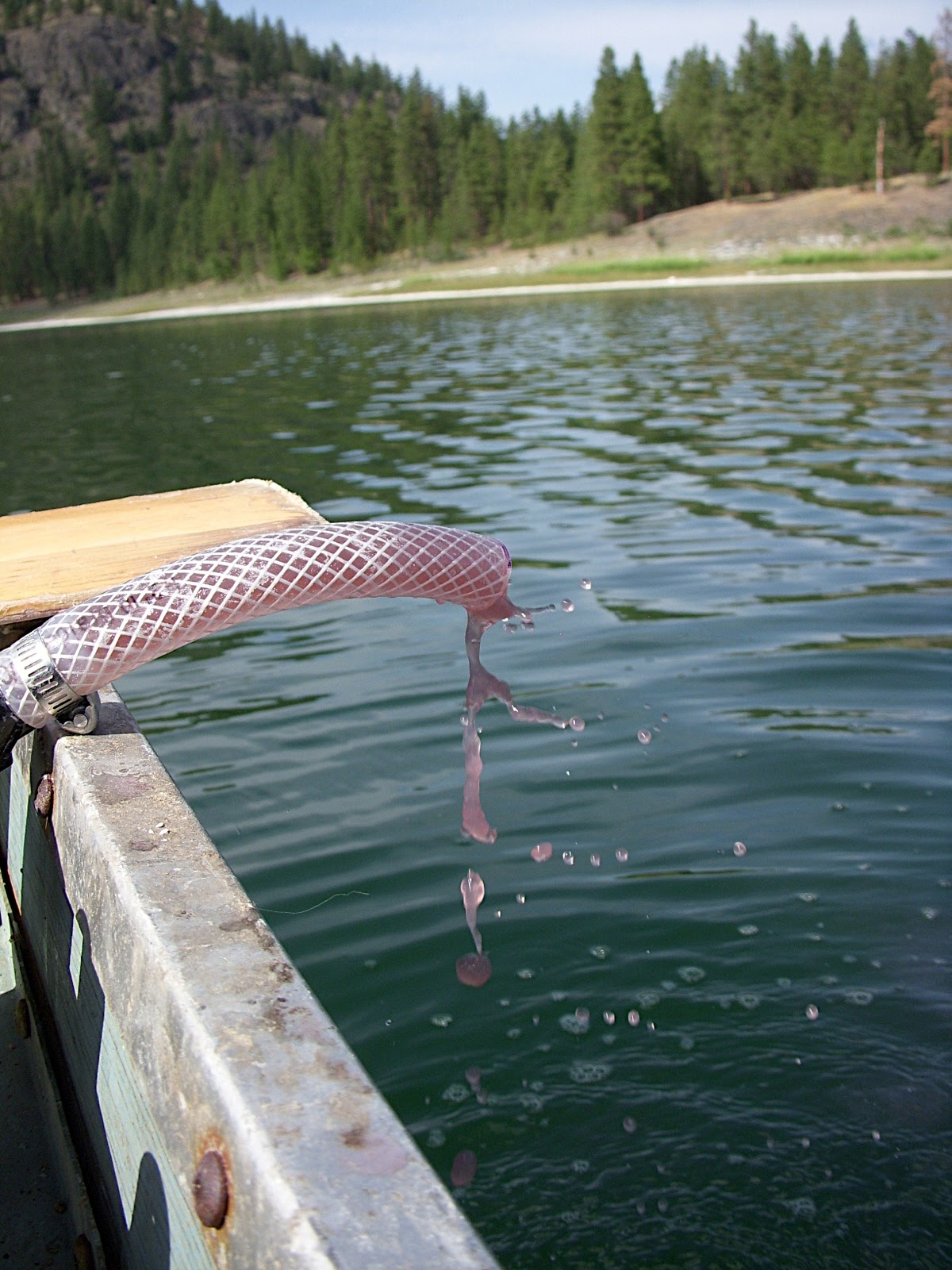
Purple bacteria pumped from a chemocline 7 meter deep in a meromictic lake

Containing the largest chemical gradient, the chemocline is a thin boundary layer that separates a meromictic lake into two parts: the upper mixolimnion and the lower monimolimnion. The mixolimnion is a region that is accessed by the wind where the water can be fully mixed and circulated. However, the monimolimnion is dense and cannot interact with the wind in the same manner, preventing mixing. Furthermore, the variability in density of the chemocline determines the degree to which the body of water will experience mixing and circulation. Since the chemocline acts as a barrier between the mixed and non-mixed layers, the deeper monimolimnion layer is often anoxic. A lack of gas exchange between the monimolimnion layer and the atmosphere causes an increase in oxygen consumption over oxygen production. This creates a negative redox potential along with anoxic and euxinia conditions.

Chemocline instability is characterized by vertical mixing events. These can be triggered by an increase in H_{2}S concentrations higher than 1 mmol/kg in the sulfide-rich deep monolimnion layer. The euxinic deep water would then upwell into the mixolimnion near the surface and hydrogen sulfide would be expelled into the atmosphere. This can also be triggered by other gases such as carbon dioxide.

In many lakes, chemocline instability is typical. Lake stratification can be upset due to mixing events that occur 1, 2, or more times per year. These mixing events occur in monomictic, dimictic, or polymictic lakes. However, in meromictic lakes, stratification is permanent. These lakes, with a stable chemocline, are typically narrow and deep with low surface to volume ratios, low wind disturbance, and ongoing eutrophication.

== Life and chemoclines ==
As a result of the differences between the upper and lower layers, aerobic life is restricted to the region above the chemocline, while anaerobic species able to live in anoxic conditions reside below the cline. Additionally, above the chemocline, photosynthetic processes can occur due to the presence of light, but below, sufficient light is not present for photosynthetic bacteria to thrive. In the mixolimnion, above the chemocline, examples of phototrophic species include cyanobacteria, while the monolimnion contains sulfate reducers and sulfide oxidizers. At the chemocline itself, photosynthetic forms of anaerobic bacteria, like green phototrophic and purple sulfur bacteria, cluster and take advantage of both the sunlight from above and the hydrogen sulfide (H_{2}S) produced by the anaerobic bacteria below. Due to the gradient of conditions, the chemocline layer may contain an abundance of phototrophic bacteria and high concentrations of thiosulfate and elemental sulfur. Methanotrophic bacteria have also been found in the anoxic gradient of some chemoclines. A study conducted in Ace Lake, located in Antarctica, investigated the process of anoxygenic photosynthesis done by green sulfur bacteria in the lake and found that they were located exclusively in the chemocline of the lake due to the presence of light and sulfide.

Furthermore, microbial processes can be responsible for the presence of chemical differences in a chemocline. Processes like carbon dioxide fixation, sulfur cycling, and exoenzyme activities occur at heightened rates in the cline compared to the surrounding body of water. Because of the various chemical properties of a chemocline, it can often support a diverse array of lifeforms in a small layer.

However, chemocline instability can upset the balance of bacterial species found in each layer. Euxinic deep water that upwells into the photic zone can introduce sulfides and cause a bloom of sulfur oxidizing bacteria in the upper mixolimnion.
