= Hydrobiology =

Science of life and life processes in water

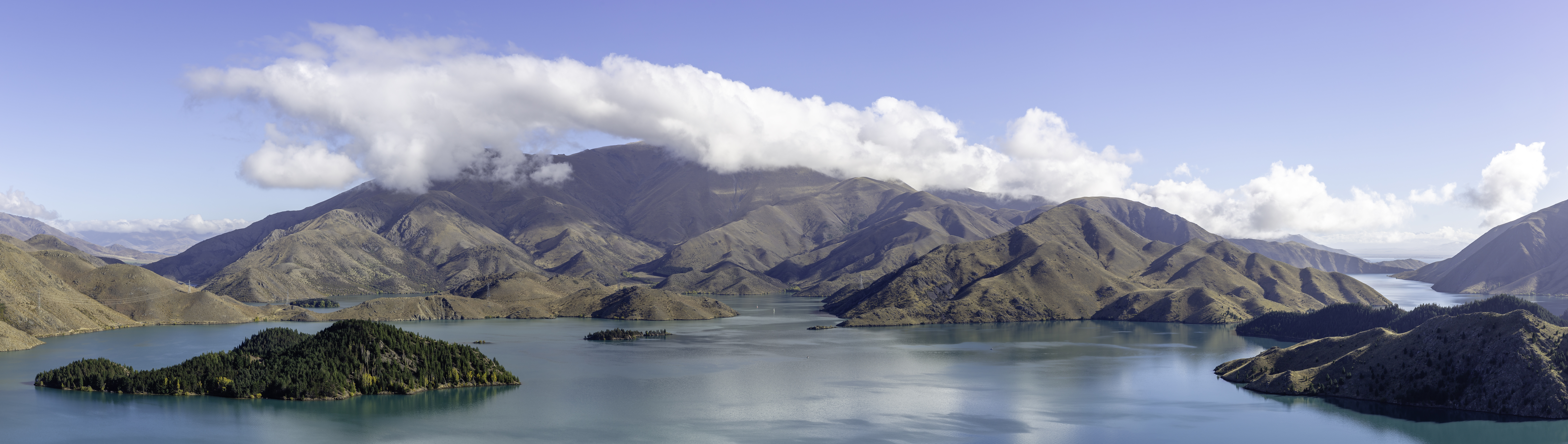
An example of a mountain lake ecosystem

Hydrobiology is the science of life and life processes in water. Much of modern hydrobiology can be viewed as a sub-discipline of ecology but the sphere of hydrobiology includes taxonomy, economic and industrial biology, morphology, and physiology. The one distinguishing aspect is that all fields relate to aquatic organisms. Most work is related to limnology and can be divided into lotic system ecology (flowing waters) and lentic system ecology (still waters).

One of the significant areas of current research is eutrophication. Special attention is paid to biotic interactions in plankton assemblage including the microbial loop, the mechanism of influencing algal blooms, phosphorus load, and lake turnover. Another subject of research is the acidification of mountain lakes. Long-term studies are carried out on changes in the ionic composition of the water of rivers, lakes and reservoirs in connection with acid rain and fertilization. One goal of current research is elucidation of the basic environmental functions of the ecosystem in reservoirs, which are important for water quality management and water supply.

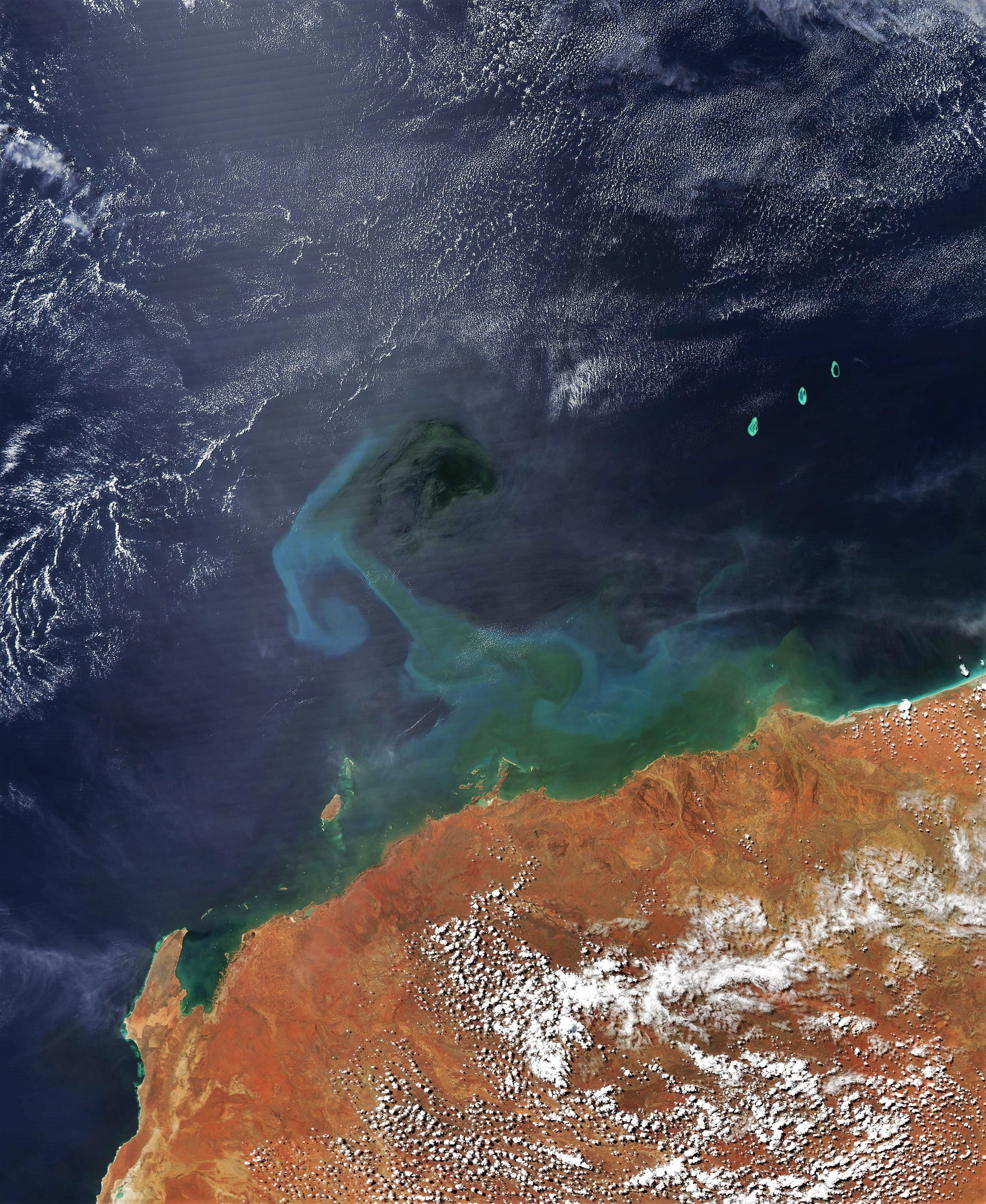
Algal Bloom from Cyclone Veronica

Much of the early work of hydrobiologists concentrated on the biological processes utilized in sewage treatment and water purification especially slow sand filters. Other historically important work sought to provide biotic indices for classifying waters according to the biotic communities that they supported. This work continues to this day in Europe in the development of classification tools for assessing water bodies for the EU water framework directive.

A hydrobiologist technician conducts field analysis for hydrobiology. They identify plants and living species, locate their habitat, and count them. They also identify pollutants and nuisances that can affect the aquatic fauna and flora. They take the samples and write reports of their observations for publications.

A hydrobiologist engineer intervenes more in the process of the study. They define the intervention protocols and what samples should be taken. They plan and program the study campaigns, and then summarize their results. In the event of pollution, they propose solutions to improve the biological quality of water within the framework of the regulations in force. In the case of complex programs, hydrobiologists can work in a multidisciplinary team with botanists and zoologists.

The hydrobiologist works on behalf of large public institutions of a scientific and technological nature (CNRS, INRA, IRD, CIRAD, IRSTEA ...), public institutions (Water Agencies, Regional Directorates environment, Higher Council of Fisheries, CEMAGREF ...), companies (EDF, Veolia environment, Suez environment, Saur, ...), local authorities, research departments, and associations (Federations of fishing, Permanent Centers for Environmental Initiatives ...).

== Training and studies ==
The biologist technician usually has a training level bac +2 or bac +3:

- DUT biological engineering options biological and biochemical analyzes (ABB), environmental engineering,
- BTSA water professions
- BTS GEMEAU - water management and control
- BTS and regional controls
- BTSA Agricultural, Biological and Biotechnological Analyzes (ANABIOTEC)
- DEUST analysis of biological media
- Bachelor's degree in biology

The engineer in hydrobiology has a training level bac +5:

- engineering school diploma: INA, ENSA, Polytech Montpellier sciences and water technologies
- master's degree in environmental sciences or biology (training examples)

environmental management and coastal ecology (University of La Rochelle)

biology of organisms and populations (University of Burgundy)

continental and coastal environments sciences Environment, Soils, Waters and Biodiversity (University of Rouen)

operation and restoration of continental aquatic environments (University of Clermont Ferrand), etc.

== Field of research interests ==
The following are the research interests of Hydrobiologists:

- Acidification impact on lake and reservoir ecosystems
- Ocean acidification
- Paleolimnology of remote mountain lakes
- Molecular ecology, phylogeography and taxonomy of Cladocera
- Chemical communication in plankton (prey-predator interaction)
- Biomanipulation of water reservoirs
- Phosphorus and nitrogen nutrient cycles

== Organizations ==
- American Society of Limnology and Oceanography (ASLO)
- International Association of Theoretical and Applied Limnology (SIL)
- American Fisheries Society
- Freshwater Biological Association, England
- Marine Biological Laboratory (USA)
- Australian Society for Fish Biology
- Fisheries and Marine Institute of Memorial University of Newfoundland
- Department of Hydrobiology (Charles University, Prague)
- Dresden University of Technology Institute of Hydrobiology
- Institute of Hydrobiology and Fishery Science
- Water Research Institute T.G.M.
- Hydrobiological Institute, Academy of Science of Czech Republic
- Research Institute of Fish Culture and Hydrobiology
- Department of Hydrobiology, Slovak Academy of Science, Bratislava, Slovakia
- Max-Planck-Institut fur Limnologie in Ploen, Germany Archived 2008-12-26 at the Wayback Machine
- CNR-Istituto Italiano di Idrobiologia
- Institute of Hydrobiology, Chinese Academy of Sciences
- Hydrobiology Pty Ltd Brisbane, Australia based private consulting company
- Institute of Zoology and Hydrobiology University of Tartu, Estonia
- Department of Hydrobiology Bulgarian Academy of Sciences
- Department of General and Applied Hydrobiology Faculty of Biology, Sofia University "Sveti Kliment Ohridski", Bulgaria

== Journals ==
- Fundamental and Applied Limnology
- International Review of Hydrobiology
- Indian Hydrobiology
- Hydrobiologia
- The African Journal of Tropical Hydrobiology and Fisheries
- Review of Hydrobiology
- The Biological Bulletin

== Notable researchers ==
- Jacques Cousteau
- Jane Lubchenco

== See also ==
- Aquatic ecosystem
- Aquatic toxicology
- Freshwater biology
- Marine biology
- Marine life
