= Freshwater biology =

Scientific study of freshwater ecosystems and biology

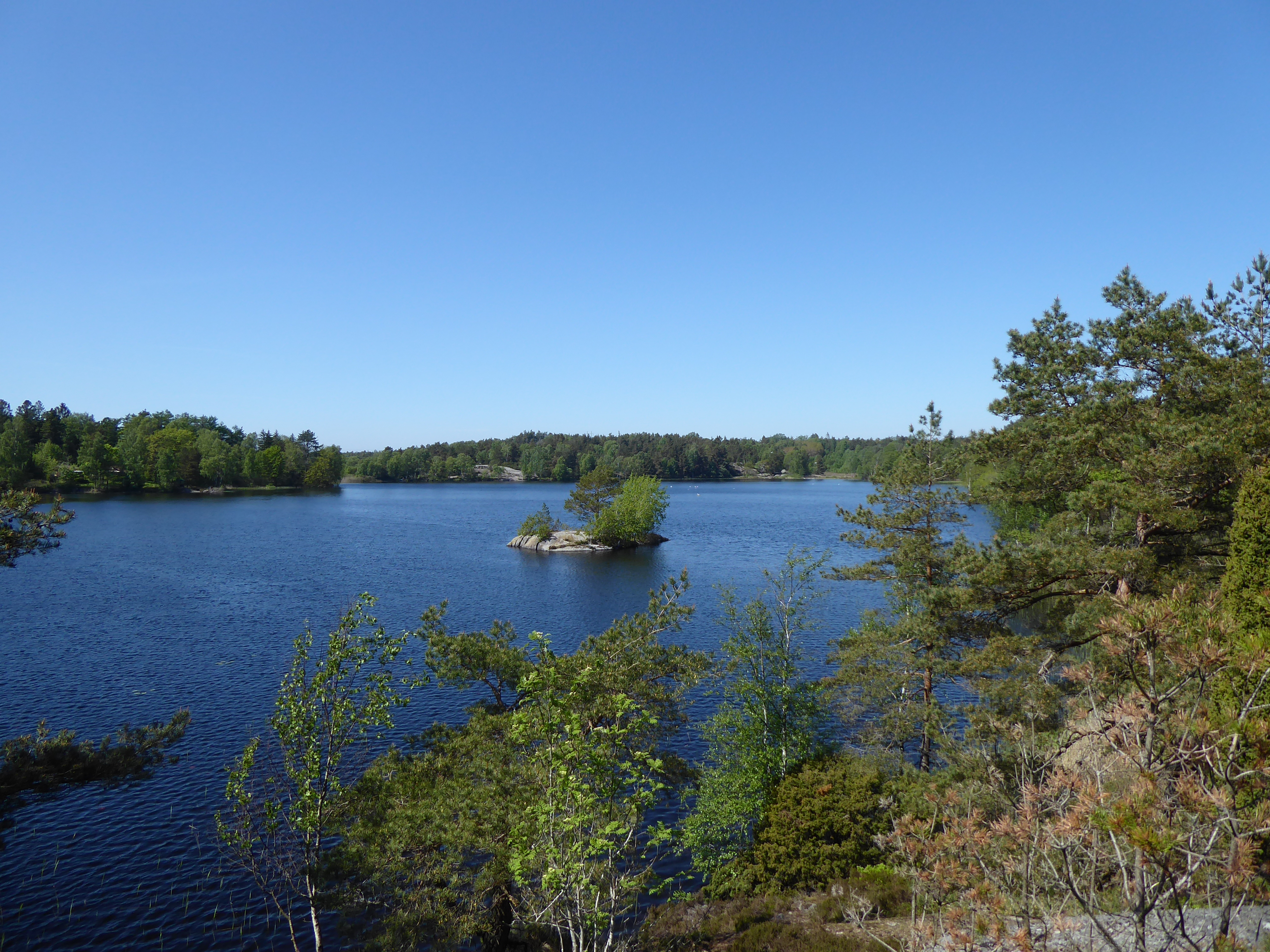
Oxsjön, a lake in Sweden. Freshwater biology focuses on environments like lakes.

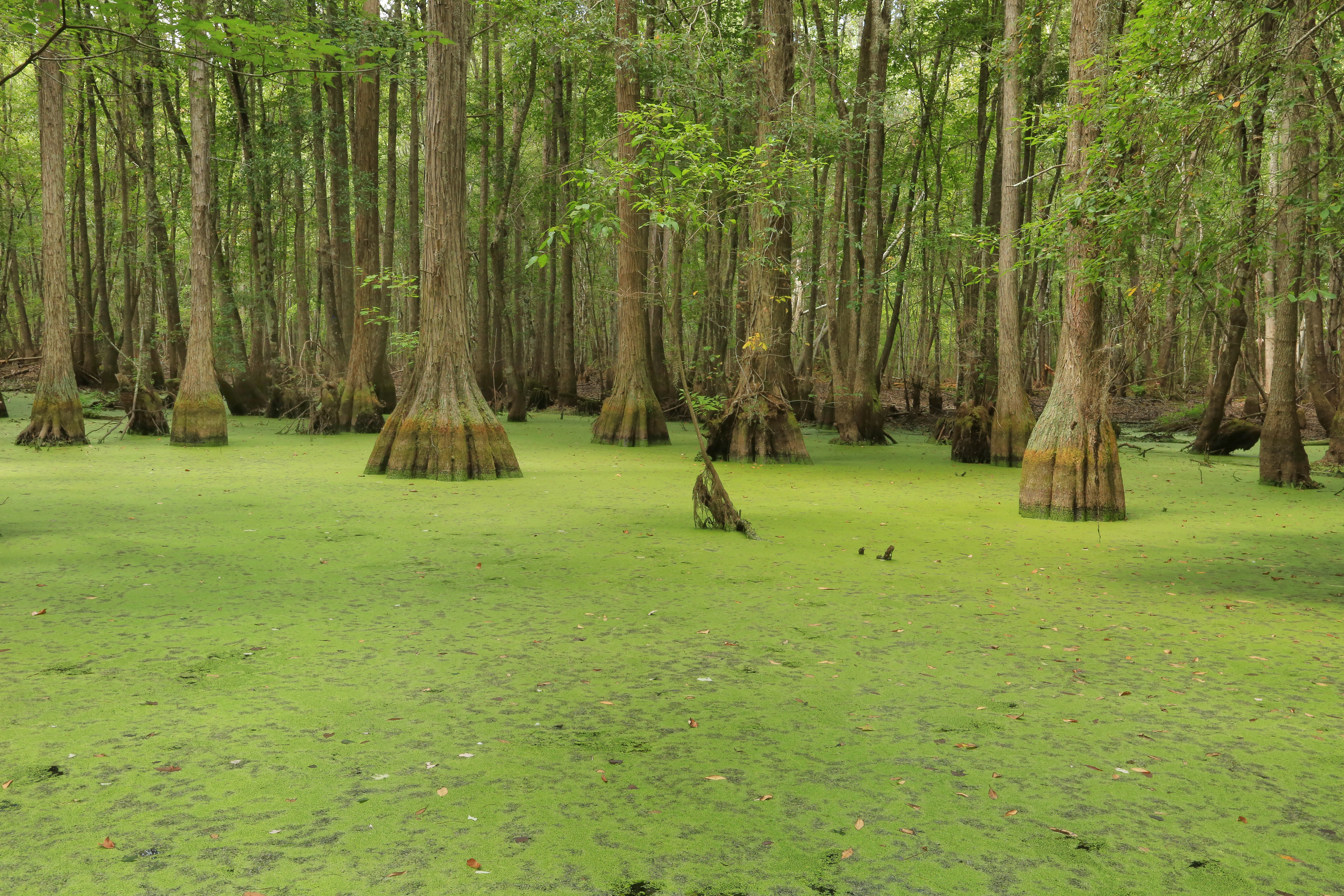
A pond in the Oconee River Floodplain in Georgia, whose surface is covered in duckweed but still contains fish.

Freshwater biology is the scientific biological study of freshwater ecosystems and is a branch of limnology. This field seeks to understand the relationships between living organisms in their physical environment. These physical environments may include rivers, lakes, streams, ponds, reservoirs, or wetlands. Knowledge from this discipline is also widely used in industrial processes to make use of biological processes involved with sewage treatment and water purification. Water presence and flow is an essential aspect to species distribution and influences when and where species interact in freshwater environments.

In the UK, the Freshwater Biological Association based near Windermere in Cumbria was one of the early institutions to research the biology of freshwater and promote the concepts of trophism in lakes and demonstrated the process of migration from oligotrophic water through mesotrophic to marsh.

Freshwater biology is also used to study the effects of climate change and increased human impact on both aquatic systems and wider ecosystems. Freshwater organisms, vertebrates especially, appear to be at a higher extinction risk from climate change than terrestrial or marine organisms.

== Freshwater habitats ==
Freshwater habitats support a wide variety of organisms with habitats including rivers, streams, lakes, ponds, and wetlands.

=== Rivers and streams ===
Running water is a type of freshwater habitat that mainly consists of rivers and streams. Running, fast-moving waters have a higher oxygen content, allowing different species to thrive and making pollution easier to combat. Running water is an open system, meaning it is not isolate and exchanges matter and energy with other systems. Being an open system, a lot of organic matter found in running water is from land runoff or further sediment upstream and this matter is an important source of food for many species. Flowing bodies of water begin at the headwaters, which include springs, lakes, and snowmelt, and travel to their mouths, typically another moving water channel or the ocean. The characteristics of the streams and rivers change throughout their journey from the source to the mouth. For example, the water at the source is clearer, has a higher oxygen content, lower temperatures, and heterotrophs common species. In the middle, the width usually expands and the species diversity increases due to temperature and oxygen content changes, including aquatic green plants and algae. The water at the mouth has a lower oxygen concentration and is murkier due to the sediment that has been collected and traveled along the length of the river or stream. This increased sediment decreases the amount of light that is able to penetrate the water and there is less diversity of flora and the lower oxygen lowers the diversity of fauna.

The riparian zone is the area along a riverbank or streambank that is home to vital, high moisture plants. These plants create a buffer between the land and the running water system, protecting it from pollution and flooding. Additionally, these plants provide a large habitat for many wetland species, a large number of which are endangered or threatened. Lastly, riparian plants shade the water from sunlight, reducing the heat stress on the water and aquatic life, while also providing nutrients in the form of organic matter.

=== Lakes and ponds ===
Standing water is a type of freshwater habitat that mainly consists of lakes and ponds. This habitat has limited species diversity because they are isolated from one another and other water systems, unlike running water. Standing water bodies undergo stratification, a process in which the water forms distinct layers at different depths due to temperature variations that cause differences in water density. Stratification does not occur in running water because of the fast moving water that mixes water with varying oxygen content together. The topmost layer has the most oxygen and as depth increases, the oxygen decreases. Stratification can be physically felt in the temperature of the water, as the uppermost layer of water is warmer than deeper water because it has been heated by the sun. This occurs during spring. However, during winter, when the surface of a lake freezes, the water just beneath the ice remains at around 1 °C, while deeper water stays near 4 °C, the temperature at which water is densest. The boundary between these two layers of differing temperatures is known as the thermocline.

Standing water can be divided into three zones based on depth and distance from shore. The littoral zone is the uppermost layer and the warmest water found in lakes and ponds, as the sun directly heats is. This zone hosts the most biodiversity in standing water, with a wide variety of organisms found here, vital to the health of the ecosystem and an important aspect of the diet of organisms in the habitat, like algae, aquatic plants, clams, insects, fish, crustaceans, and amphibians. The limnetic zone is found below the littoral zone. This zone has lower temperatures, is fairly well-lit, and is occupied by a smaller variety of organisms, including phytoplankton, zooplankton, and fish. The plankton found in this zone play a crucial role in the food web of the habitat and support the diet of many important organisms. The deepest zone is the profundal zone, with very little light, colder temperatures, and higher density than the previous layers. When plankton die they fall into this layer and provide nutrients to the fauna that live in this layer. These faunas are called heterotrophs, meaning they eat dead organisms and use oxygen for cellular respiration, resulting in lower oxygen content in the profundal zone.

The mixing of the layers of water in standing water mostly comes from seasonal overturn. During the fall and spring, there is a mixing of layers usually due to wind that circulates oxygen and creates a more uniform temperature throughout the water system. The shore zone is the transitional zone between the water systems and land, similar to the riparian zone seen in running water systems. This area functions in much the same way as the riparian zone, the plants protecting the water from pollution, flooding, and heat stress, while also providing nutrients and habitats for aquatic and wetland species.

=== Wetlands ===
Wetlands are a specific type of standing water habitats that include marshes, swamps, and bogs. Due to the waterlogged and submerged nature of the land, the anaerobic conditions of wetlands are unique and support the highest species diversity of all ecosystems. Wetlands slow the decomposition of organic matter, creating layers of rich organic material that provides important nutrients for species in the system. The fauna that reside in wetlands are called hydrophytes, meaning they are adapted to very moist and humid conditions. Wetlands are the home to a large number of bird, amphibian, insect, reptile, grass, and tree species that cannot inhabit any other system, making them at risk to endangerment, as wetlands are being destroyed for urban development and agriculture. Wetlands help combat pollution and climate change, as they filter pollutants and store a large amount of carbon from the biosphere in their moist soil and still water, despite the small amount of land they occupy. Additionally, wetlands provide flood and storm protection, as the system can absorb large amounts of excess water. Wetland's ability to absorb water also assists groundwater recharge, which is very important for human water use, as usable freshwater sources are dwindling. Wetlands are not only freshwater habitats and systems, as there are salt marshes and bogs that support different species.

Carolina Bays (also known as pocosins, meaning "swamp on a hill") are a unique form of wetland predominately found in the Carolinas, with a few being found outside of the Carolinas along the East Coast of the United States. Carolina Bays are characterized as elliptical shaped depressions that are surrounded by a sand rim and have a sandy bottom. This depression goes through wet and dry periods, filling with rainwater during the winter and spring months, and drying out in the summer. Carolina Bays often contain rare species, some endemic to the bays.

== Freshwater organisms ==
Freshwater organisms are generally divided into the categories of benthic and pelagic organisms, as these are the two zones of life found in the freshwater biome. Freshwater organism can include invertebrates, insects, fish, amphibians, mammals, birds, aquatic plants, aquatic fungi and planktons.

=== Invertebrates ===
Freshwater invertebrates include freshwater mollusks, insects, crustaceans, and worms. Freshwater invertebrates provide an important link in freshwater food chains, transporting the nutrients and energy from producers such as algae and aquatic plants to higher consumers such as fish and amphibians. Additionally, invertebrates can act as important bio-indicators for ecosystem health.

=== Fish ===
Freshwater fish include a are very diverse, consisting of more than 18,000 species and making up 1/4 of the world's vertebrate species. Around half of fish species live in freshwater environments, the other half living in saltwater. Some fish, such as salmon and some species of shark, are able to travel between the freshwater and saltwater environments, linking the two. These fish are referred to as diadromous fish, stemming from Greek and meaning "to run between", in reference to the fish running between freshwater and saltwater.

=== Amphibians ===
Amphibians, which include frogs, toads, salamanders, and caecilians, are a group that predominately exist in freshwater habitats. Amphibians are exotherms that possess thing skin, meaning that they rely on water to remain hydrated. Amphibians are Amphibians can act as an indicator of environmental health, as they are easily affected by changes in the environment, such as pollution or climate change.

=== Birds ===
Water birds are a group of birds that rely on aquatic habitats for hunting, resting, and sometimes nesting. Birds that rely on freshwater habitats include birds such as kingfishers, flamingos, and various types of waterfowl. Many species rely on the plants in these freshwater environments for nesting material, habitat, and food. Additionally, freshwater birds act as a control for fish and insects in freshwater environments.

=== Aquatic Plants ===
Aquatic plants or macrophytes act much like terrestrial plants, providing the basis for the food chain, removal of carbon dioxide, and production of oxygen. Aquatic plants can be divided into 4 categories: emergent, floating-leaved, free-floating and submerged. Emergent macrophytes have stalks and leaves that rise above the water surface, while floating-leaved macrophytes are anchored in the lakebed with leaves that rest on the surface. Free-floating macrophytes drift freely on the water, and submerged macrophytes grow completely beneath the surface.

=== Freshwater Fungi ===
Freshwater fungi are fungi that spend their whole, or at least one part of their life cycle in water. Fungi are diverse in freshwater, including fungi from almost all phyla of Fungi, encompassing 3,870 described species (per 2022). They parttake in these ecosystems as decomposers, lichens, parasites, mutualists and more. Ascomycetes are dominating the biodiversity with around 3,000 species, with the majority being sordariomycetes. Chytrids are mostly known from aquatic systems, and encompass 333 described species, where most of these are parasites of planktonic algae. Most freshwater fungi are microscopic, but are important drivers of nutrient cycling and in food webs.

== Threats ==
The most common cause of water pollution is stormwater runoff from developed areas, like pavement and rooftops. Stormwater runoff is moving rain and snowmelt that has not been absorbed. The impervious surfaces used in domestic and urban construction replace soil that used to absorb stormwater, increasing the amount of runoff traveling farther distances. This excess runoff can collect pollutants as it eventually makes its way into streams, rivers, lakes, wetlands, and even aquifers, polluting important freshwater ecosystems and usable water. Additionally, increased flooding and erosion can be caused by the increased stormwater runoff.

=== Pollution of flowing water ===
Rivers and streams drain water that falls on upland areas, and this moving water dissolves pollutants at a faster rate than standing water. However, due to the high production and placement of pollutants in these moving waters, the waters become polluted faster than the pollutant dilution rate, leading to over polluted rivers and streams. All three of the major contributors to pollution – industry, agriculture, and cities – are commonly found along moving waters, adding to the over-pollution of rivers and streams. Just the knowledge that fast moving waters can dilute pollutants has encouraged even more pollution, further adding to the pollution issue. Another issue contributing to the destruction of rivers and streams is the physical alteration of these moving waters, mainly in the form of dams, diversion of water, channel alteration, and land development. These alterations affect water temperature, water flow patterns, and increase sediment, destroying important habitat conditions for many aquatic organisms and reducing water quality.

An area of contention regarding the pollution of streams and rivers is the concept that the pollution upstream affects the people downstream. A factory's waste upstream may contaminate someone's drinking water downstream. This especially becomes an issue with bodies of moving water that border multiple countries or states, as what one country or state does upstream can drastically affect what the downstream country or state is able to do.

=== Pollution of standing water ===
Lakes and ponds experience much of the same pollution as rivers and streams, but are polluted at a quicker rate due to slower moving waters, no water flow outlets, and amount of water. Standing water circulates much less than moving waters, with the deeper water layers only moving during seasonal changes twice a year. Lakes and ponds are basins into which running water usually flows and accumulates, meaning that the pollutants also accumulate with no outlet. Lakes and ponds contain less water than most rivers and streams, meaning smaller lakes and ponds are polluted at faster rates.

Eutrophication is the process of abundant plant growth, a dominating threat to standing waters. If chemical nutrients for aquatic plant growth that were previously limited become available, plant populations will increase rapidly. This excessive plant population growth decreases the oxygen content of the water, and other aquatic life suffocates. Human waste often contains these chemical nutrients, like phosphorus in fertilizers, and in combination with the poor water circulation in standing waters, causes pollution and organism depletion. Much of the pollution issues that affect ponds and lakes also affect wetlands, as the water circulation of wetlands is also slow.

=== Groundwater pollution and depletion ===
Surface water is where groundwater is being expressed, with wetlands being the largest examples of the water table being near or at the surface. The water found in freshwater habitats are the combination of surface flow, precipitation, and groundwater expression. This relationship between groundwater and surface water means that groundwater pollution affects surface freshwater pollution as well.

According to an Environmental Protection Agency survey, about a quarter of the United States' usable groundwater is contaminated. Groundwater is the only source of drinking water for about half of the United States. As human populations increase and industrialize, the demand for groundwater is increasing, but the pollution of groundwater is also increasing. The pollution of groundwater is easy to achieve due to the slow circulation of water, even slower than that of lakes and ponds. The water must navigate through small holes in the aquifer rock, moving on average only a couple of inches each day. The rate of groundwater recharge is the time it takes for groundwater to replenish itself and extremely slow, leading to water shortages, as humans remove water from aquifers faster than the rate of recharge. Due to such slow circulation of water, groundwater can remain polluted for decades, as the natural purification processes are so slow.

== See also ==
- Limnology
- Marine biology
- Pond life
