= Demersal zone =

Part of the water column near to the seabed and the benthos

The demersal zone (from Latin demergere, "to sink") is the part of the sea or ocean (or deep lake) consisting of the part of the water column near to (and significantly affected by) the seabed and the benthos. The demersal zone is just above the benthic zone and forms a layer of the larger profundal zone.

Being just above the ocean floor, the demersal zone is variable in depth and can be part of the photic zone where light can penetrate, and photosynthetic organisms grow, or the aphotic zone, which begins between depths of roughly 200 and 1,000 m (700 and 3,300 ft) and extends to the ocean depths, where no light penetrates.

== Fish ==
The distinction between demersal species of fish and pelagic species is not always clear cut. The Atlantic cod (Gadus morhua) is a typical demersal fish, but can also be found in the open water column, and the Atlantic herring (Clupea harengus) is predominantly a pelagic species but forms large aggregations near the seabed when it spawns on banks of gravel.

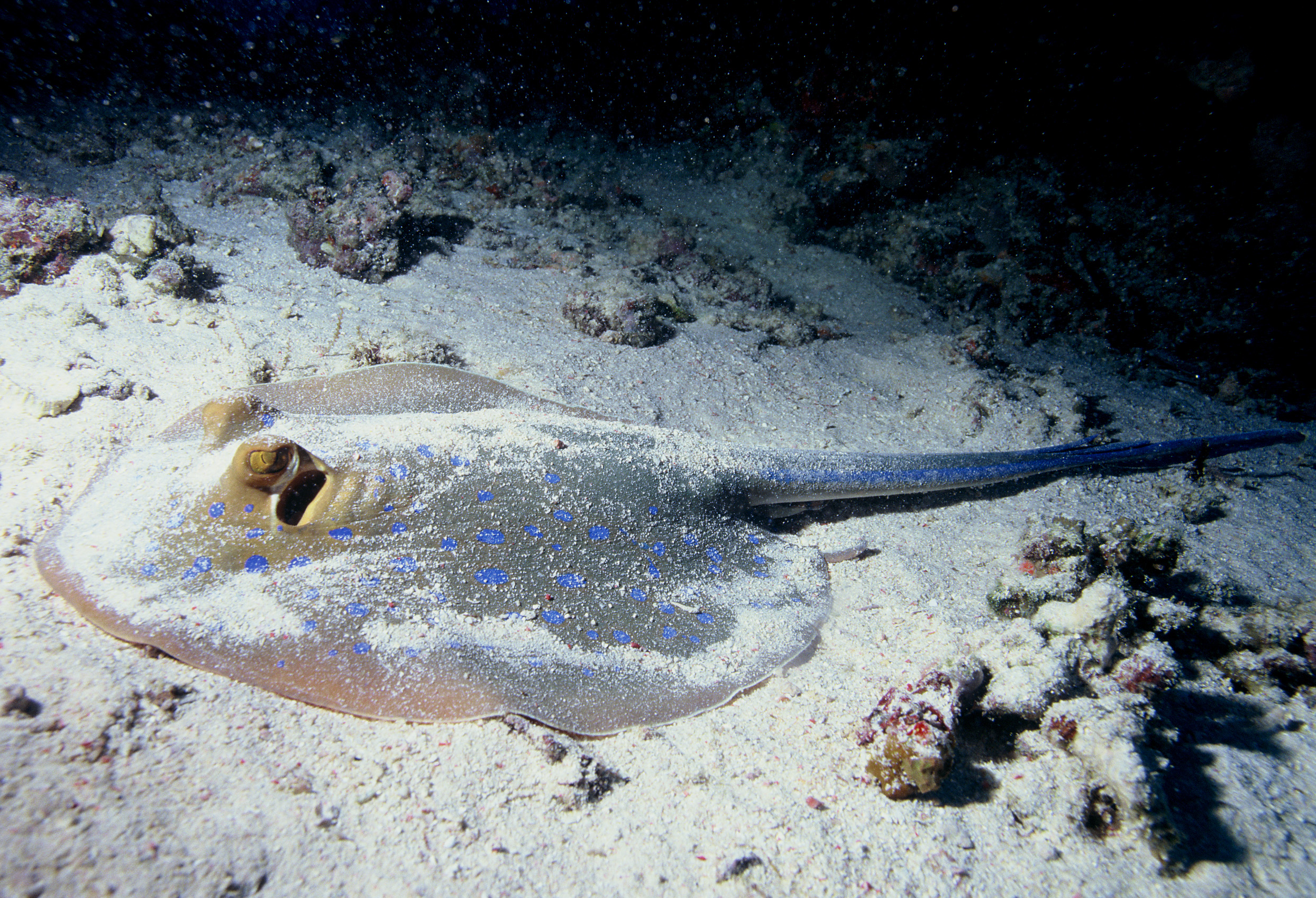
The bluespotted ribbontail ray lives in the demersal zone on or just above the seafloor

Two types of fish inhabit the demersal zone: those that are heavier than water and rest on the seabed, and those that have neutral buoyancy and remain just above the substrate. In many species of fish, neutral buoyancy is maintained by a gas-filled swim bladder which can be expanded or contracted as the circumstances require. A disadvantage of this method is that adjustments need to be made constantly as the water pressure varies when the fish swims higher and lower in the water column. An alternative buoyancy aid is the use of lipids, which are less dense than water—squalene, commonly found in shark livers, has a specific gravity of just 0.86. In the velvet belly lanternshark (Etmopterus spinax), a benthopelagic species, 17% of the bodyweight is liver of which 70% are lipids. Benthic rays and skates have smaller livers with lower concentrations of lipids; they are therefore denser than water and they do not swim continuously, intermittently resting on the seabed. Some fish have no buoyancy aids but use their pectoral fins which are so angled as to give lift as they swim. The disadvantage of this is that, if they stop swimming, the fish sink, and they cannot hover, or swim backwards.

Demersal fish have various feeding strategies; many feed on zooplankton or organisms or algae on the seabed; some of these feed on epifauna (invertebrates on top of the seafloor), while others specialise on infauna (invertebrates that burrow beneath the seafloor). Others are scavengers, eating the dead remains of plants or animals, while still others are predators.

== Invertebrates ==
Zooplankton are animals that drift with the current, but many have some limited means of locomotion and have some control over the depths at which they drift. They use gas-filled sacs or accumulations of substances with low densities to provide buoyancy, or they may have structures that slow down any passive descent. Where the adult, benthic organism is limited to life in a certain range of depths, their larvae need to optimise their chances of settling on a suitable substrate.

Cuttlefish are able to adjust their buoyancy using their cuttlebones, lightweight rigid structures with cavities filled with gas, which have a specific gravity of about 0.6. This enables them to swim at varying depths. Another invertebrate that feeds on the seabed and has swimming abilities is the nautilus, which stores gas in its chambers and adjusts its buoyancy by use of osmosis, pumping water in and out.
