= Aquatic ecosystem =

Ecosystem in a body of water

An aquatic ecosystem is an ecosystem found in and around a body of water, in contrast to land-based terrestrial ecosystems. Aquatic ecosystems contain communities of organisms—aquatic life—that are dependent on each other and on their environment. The two main types of aquatic ecosystems are marine ecosystems and freshwater ecosystems. Freshwater ecosystems may be lentic (slow moving water, including pools, ponds, and lakes); lotic (faster moving water, for example streams and rivers); and wetlands (areas where the soil is saturated or inundated for at least part of the time).

== Types ==
=== Marine ecosystems ===
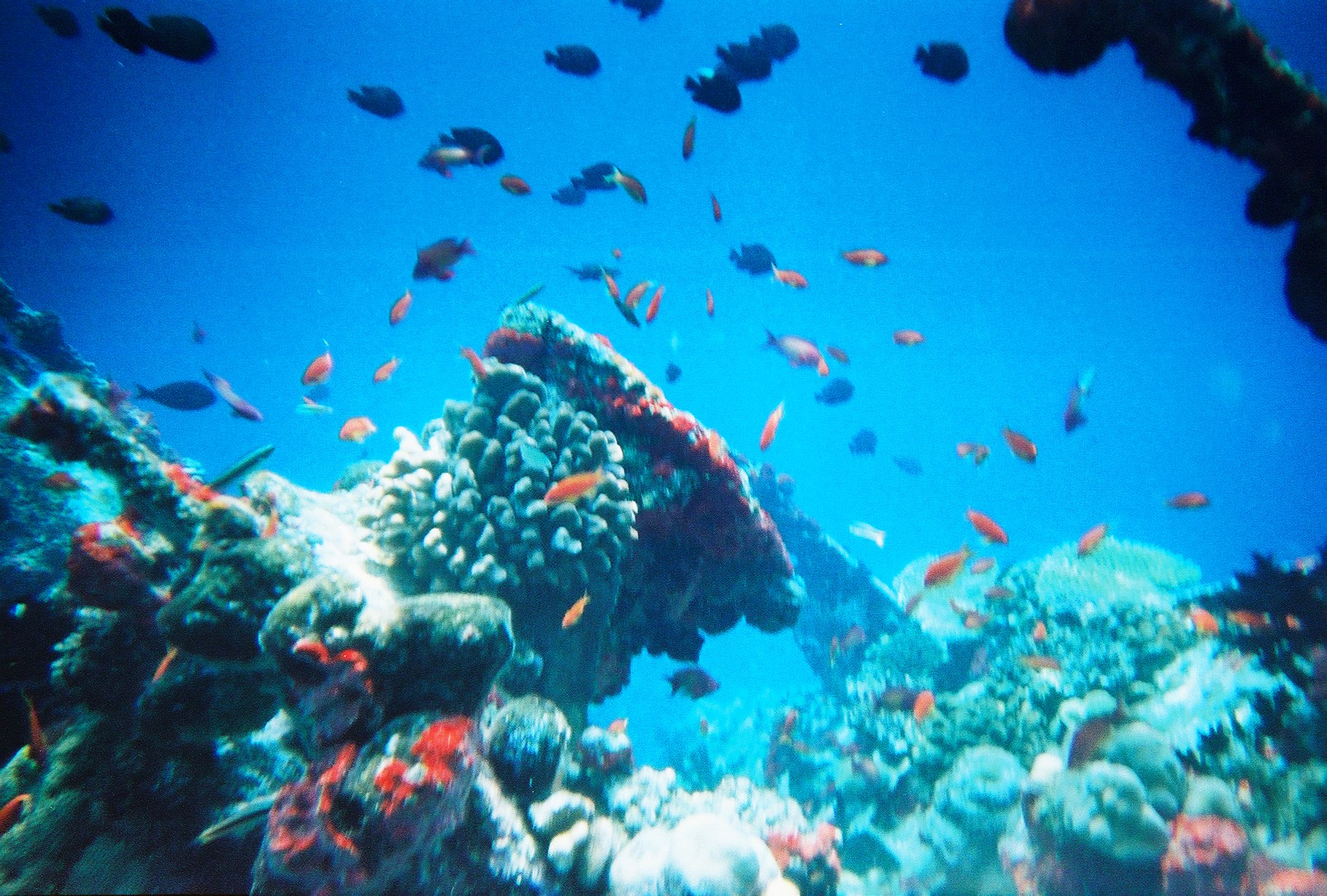
Coral reefs form complex marine ecosystems with tremendous biodiversity.

Marine ecosystems are the largest of Earth's aquatic ecosystems and exist in waters that have a high salt content. These systems contrast with freshwater ecosystems, which have a lower salt content. Marine waters cover more than 70% of the surface of the Earth and account for more than 97% of Earth's water supply and 90% of habitable space on Earth. Seawater has an average salinity of 35 parts per thousand of water. Actual salinity varies among different marine ecosystems. Marine ecosystems can be divided into many zones depending upon water depth and shoreline features. The oceanic zone is the vast open part of the ocean where animals such as whales, sharks, and tuna live. The benthic zone consists of substrates below water where many invertebrates live. The intertidal zone is the area between high and low tides. Other near-shore (neritic) zones can include mudflats, seagrass meadows, mangroves, rocky intertidal systems, salt marshes, coral reefs, kelp forests and lagoons. In the deep water, hydrothermal vents may occur where chemosynthetic sulfur bacteria form the base of the food web.

==== Marine coastal ecosystem ====
A marine coastal ecosystem is a marine ecosystem which occurs where the land meets the ocean. Worldwide there is about 620,000 kilometres (390,000 mi) of coastline. Coastal habitats extend to the margins of the continental shelves, occupying about 7 percent of the ocean surface area. Marine coastal ecosystems include many very different types of marine habitats, each with their own characteristics and species composition. They are characterized by high levels of biodiversity and productivity.

==== Marine surface ecosystem ====
Organisms that live freely at the ocean surface, termed neuston, include keystone organisms like the golden seaweed Sargassum that makes up the Sargasso Sea, floating barnacles, marine snails, nudibranchs, and cnidarians. Many ecologically and economically important fish species live as or rely upon neuston. Species at the surface are not distributed uniformly; the ocean's surface provides habitat for unique neustonic communities and ecoregions found at only certain latitudes and only in specific ocean basins. But the surface is also on the front line of climate change and pollution. Life on the ocean's surface connects worlds. From shallow waters to the deep sea, the open ocean to rivers and lakes, numerous terrestrial and marine species depend on the surface ecosystem and the organisms found there.

=== Freshwater ecosystems ===
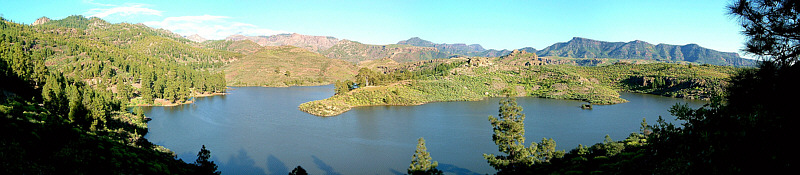
Freshwater ecosystem

Freshwater ecosystems are a subset of Earth's aquatic ecosystems that include the biological communities inhabiting freshwater waterbodies such as lakes, ponds, rivers, streams, springs, bogs, and wetlands. They can be contrasted with marine ecosystems, which have a much higher salinity. Freshwater habitats can be classified by different factors, including temperature, light penetration, nutrients, and vegetation.

==== Lentic ecosystem (lakes) ====
A lake ecosystem or lacustrine ecosystem includes biotic (living) plants, animals and micro-organisms, as well as abiotic (non-living) physical and chemical interactions. Lake ecosystems are a prime example of lentic ecosystems (lentic refers to stationary or relatively still freshwater, from the Latin lentus, which means "sluggish"), which include ponds, lakes and wetlands, and much of this article applies to lentic ecosystems in general. Lentic ecosystems can be compared with lotic ecosystems, which involve flowing terrestrial waters such as rivers and streams. Together, these two ecosystems are examples of freshwater ecosystems.

Lentic systems are diverse, ranging from a small, temporary rainwater pool a few inches deep to Lake Baikal, which has a maximum depth of 1642 m. The general distinction between pools/ponds and lakes is vague, but Brown states that ponds and pools have their entire bottom surfaces exposed to light, while lakes do not. In addition, some lakes become seasonally stratified. Ponds and pools have two regions: the pelagic open water zone, and the benthic zone, which comprises the bottom and shore regions. Since lakes have deep bottom regions not exposed to light, these systems have an additional zone, the profundal. These three areas can have very different abiotic conditions and, hence, host species that are specifically adapted to live there.

==== Lotic ecosystem (rivers) ====
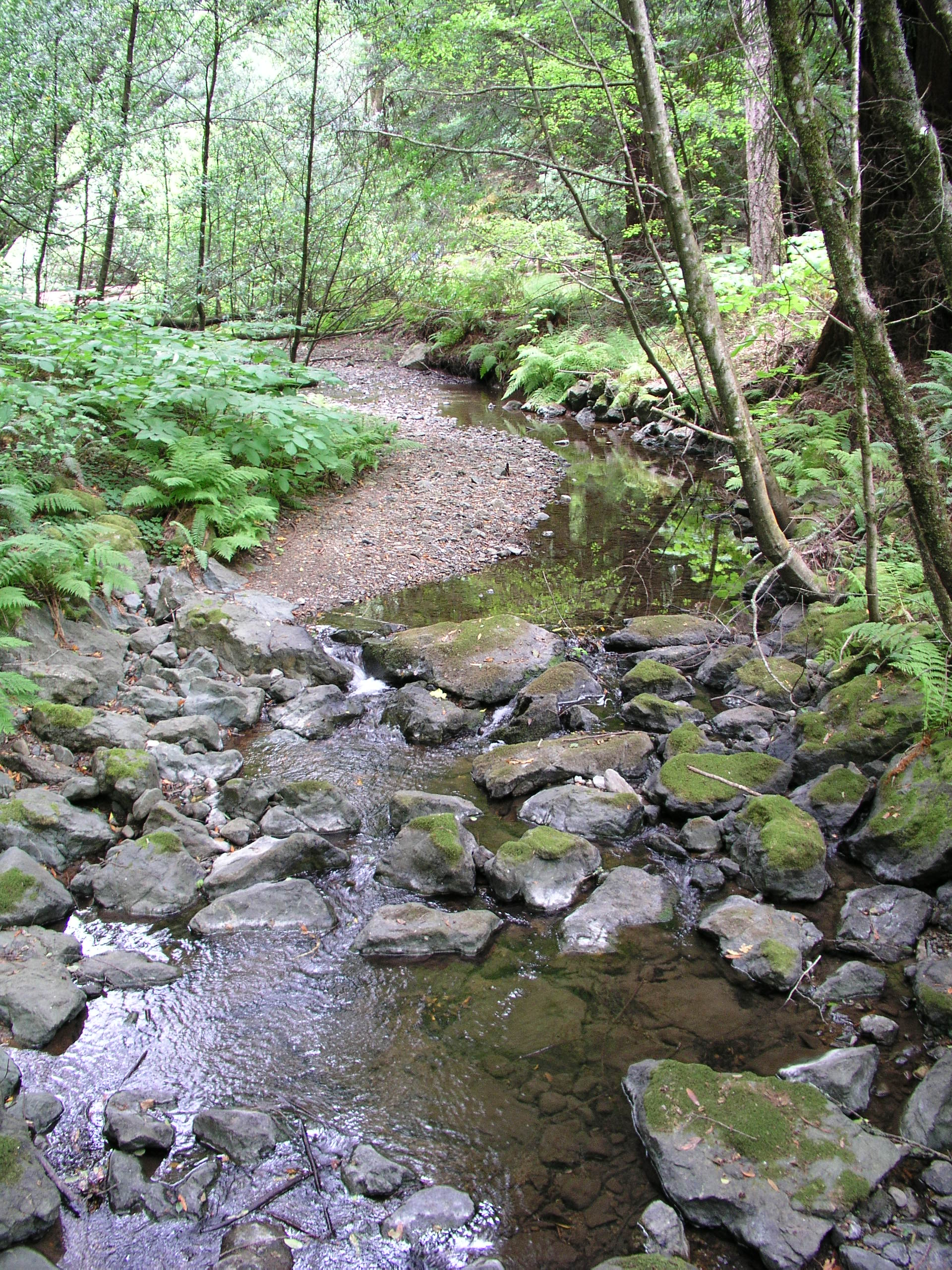
This stream operating together with its environment can be thought of as forming a river ecosystem.

River ecosystems are flowing waters that drain the landscape, and include the biotic (living) interactions amongst plants, animals and micro-organisms, as well as abiotic (nonliving) physical and chemical interactions of its many parts. River ecosystems are part of larger watershed networks or catchments, where smaller headwater streams drain into mid-size streams, which progressively drain into larger river networks. The major zones in river ecosystems are determined by the river bed's gradient or by the velocity of the current. Faster moving turbulent water typically contains greater concentrations of dissolved oxygen, which supports greater biodiversity than the slow-moving water of pools. These distinctions form the basis for the division of rivers into upland and lowland rivers.

The food base of streams within riparian forests is mostly derived from the trees, but wider streams and those that lack a canopy derive the majority of their food base from algae. Anadromous fish are also an important source of nutrients. Environmental threats to rivers include loss of water, dams, chemical pollution and introduced species. A dam produces negative effects that continue down the watershed. The most important negative effects are the reduction of spring flooding, which damages wetlands, and the retention of sediment, which leads to the loss of deltaic wetlands.

==== Wetlands ====
A wetland is a distinct semi-aquatic ecosystem whose groundcovers are flooded or saturated in water, either permanently, for years or decades, or only seasonally. Flooding results in oxygen-poor (anoxic) processes taking place, especially in the soils. Wetlands form a transitional zone between waterbodies and dry lands, and are different from other terrestrial or aquatic ecosystems due to their vegetation's roots having adapted to oxygen-poor waterlogged soils. They are considered among the most biologically diverse of all ecosystems, serving as habitats to a wide range of aquatic and semi-aquatic plants and animals, with often improved water quality due to plant removal of excess nutrients such as nitrates and phosphorus.

== Functions ==
Aquatic ecosystems perform many important environmental functions. For example, they recycle nutrients, purify water, attenuate floods, recharge ground water and provide habitats for wildlife. The biota of an aquatic ecosystem contribute to its self-purification, most notably microorganisms, phytoplankton, higher plants, invertebrates, fish, bacteria, protists, aquatic fungi, and more. These organisms are actively involved in multiple self-purification processes, including organic matter destruction and water filtration. It is crucial that aquatic ecosystems are reliably self-maintained, as they also provide habitats for species that reside in them.

In addition to environmental functions, aquatic ecosystems are also used for human recreation, and are very important to the tourism industry, especially in coastal regions. They are also used for religious purposes, such as religious tourism to the Jordan River by Christians, and educational purposes, such as the usage of lakes for ecological study.

== Biotic characteristics (living components) ==
The biotic characteristics are mainly determined by the organisms that occur. For example, wetland plants may produce dense canopies that cover large areas of sediment or snails or geese may graze the vegetation leaving large mud flats. Aquatic environments have relatively low oxygen levels, forcing adaptation by the organisms found there. For example, many wetland plants must produce aerenchyma to carry oxygen to roots. Other biotic characteristics are more subtle and difficult to measure, such as the relative importance of competition, mutualism or predation. There are a growing number of cases where predation by coastal herbivores including snails, geese and mammals appears to be a dominant biotic factor.

=== Autotrophic organisms ===
Autotrophic organisms are producers that generate organic compounds from inorganic material. Algae use solar energy to generate biomass from carbon dioxide and are possibly the most important autotrophic organisms in aquatic environments. The more shallow the water, the greater the biomass contribution from rooted and floating vascular plants. These two sources combine to produce the extraordinary production of estuaries and wetlands, as this autotrophic biomass is converted into fish, birds, amphibians and other aquatic species.

Chemosynthetic bacteria are found in benthic marine ecosystems. These organisms are able to feed on hydrogen sulfide in water that comes from volcanic vents. Great concentrations of animals that feed on these bacteria are found around volcanic vents. For example, there are giant tube worms (Riftia pachyptila) 1.5 m in length and clams (Calyptogena magnifica) 30 cm long.

=== Heterotrophic organisms ===
Heterotrophic organisms consume autotrophic organisms and use the organic compounds in their bodies as energy sources and as raw materials to create their own biomass.

Euryhaline organisms are salt tolerant and can survive in marine ecosystems, while stenohaline or salt intolerant species can only live in freshwater environments.

== Abiotic characteristics (non-living components) ==
An ecosystem is composed of biotic communities that are structured by biological interactions and abiotic environmental factors. Some of the important abiotic environmental factors of aquatic ecosystems include substrate type, water depth, nutrient levels, temperature, salinity, and flow. It is often difficult to determine the relative importance of these factors without rather large experiments. There may be complicated feedback loops. For example, sediment may determine the presence of aquatic plants, but aquatic plants may also trap sediment, and add to the sediment through peat.

The amount of dissolved oxygen in a water body is frequently the key substance in determining the extent and kinds of organic life in the water body. Fish need dissolved oxygen to survive, although their tolerance to low oxygen varies among species; in extreme cases of low oxygen, some fish even resort to air gulping. Plants often have to produce aerenchyma, while the shape and size of leaves may also be altered. Conversely, oxygen is fatal to many kinds of anaerobic bacteria.

Nutrient levels are important in controlling the abundance of many species of algae. The relative abundance of nitrogen and phosphorus can in effect determine which species of algae come to dominate. Algae are a very important source of food for aquatic life, but at the same time, if they become over-abundant, they can cause declines in fish when they decay. Similar over-abundance of algae in coastal environments such as the Gulf of Mexico produces, upon decay, a hypoxic region of water known as a dead zone.

The salinity of the water body is also a determining factor in the kinds of species found in the water body. Organisms in marine ecosystems tolerate salinity, while many freshwater organisms are intolerant of salt. The degree of salinity in an estuary or delta is an important control upon the type of wetland (fresh, intermediate, or brackish), and the associated animal species. Dams built upstream may reduce spring flooding, and reduce sediment accretion, and may therefore lead to saltwater intrusion in coastal wetlands.

Freshwater used for irrigation purposes often absorbs levels of salt that are harmful to freshwater organisms.

== Threats ==
The health of an aquatic ecosystem is degraded when the ecosystem's ability to absorb a stress has been exceeded. A stress on an aquatic ecosystem can be a result of physical, chemical or biological alterations to the environment. Physical alterations include changes in water temperature, water flow and light availability. Chemical alterations include changes in the loading rates of biostimulatory nutrients, oxygen-consuming materials, and toxins. Biological alterations include over-harvesting of commercial species and the introduction of exotic species. Human populations can impose excessive stresses on aquatic ecosystems. Climate change driven by anthropogenic activities can harm aquatic ecosystems by disrupting current distribution patterns of plants and animals. It has negatively impacted deep sea biodiversity, coastal fish diversity, crustaceans, coral reefs, and other biotic components of these ecosystems. Human-made aquatic ecosystems, such as ditches, aquaculture ponds, and irrigation channels, may also cause harm to naturally occurring ecosystems by trading off biodiversity with their intended purposes. For instance, ditches are primarily used for drainage, but their presence also negatively affects biodiversity.

There are many examples of excessive stresses with negative consequences. The environmental history of the Great Lakes of North America illustrates this problem, particularly how multiple stresses, such as water pollution, over-harvesting and invasive species can combine. The Norfolk Broadlands in England illustrate similar decline with pollution and invasive species. Lake Pontchartrain along the Gulf of Mexico illustrates the negative effects of different stresses including levee construction, logging of swamps, invasive species and salt water intrusion.

== See also ==
- Aquatic plant – Plant that has adapted to living in an aquatic environment
- Hydrobiology – Science of life and life processes in water
- Hydrosphere – Liquid water on a planet
- Limnology – Science of inland aquatic ecosystems
- Ocean
- Stephen Alfred Forbes – American naturalist - one of the founders of aquatic ecosystem science
- Stream metabolism
