= Lake ecosystem =

Type of ecosystem

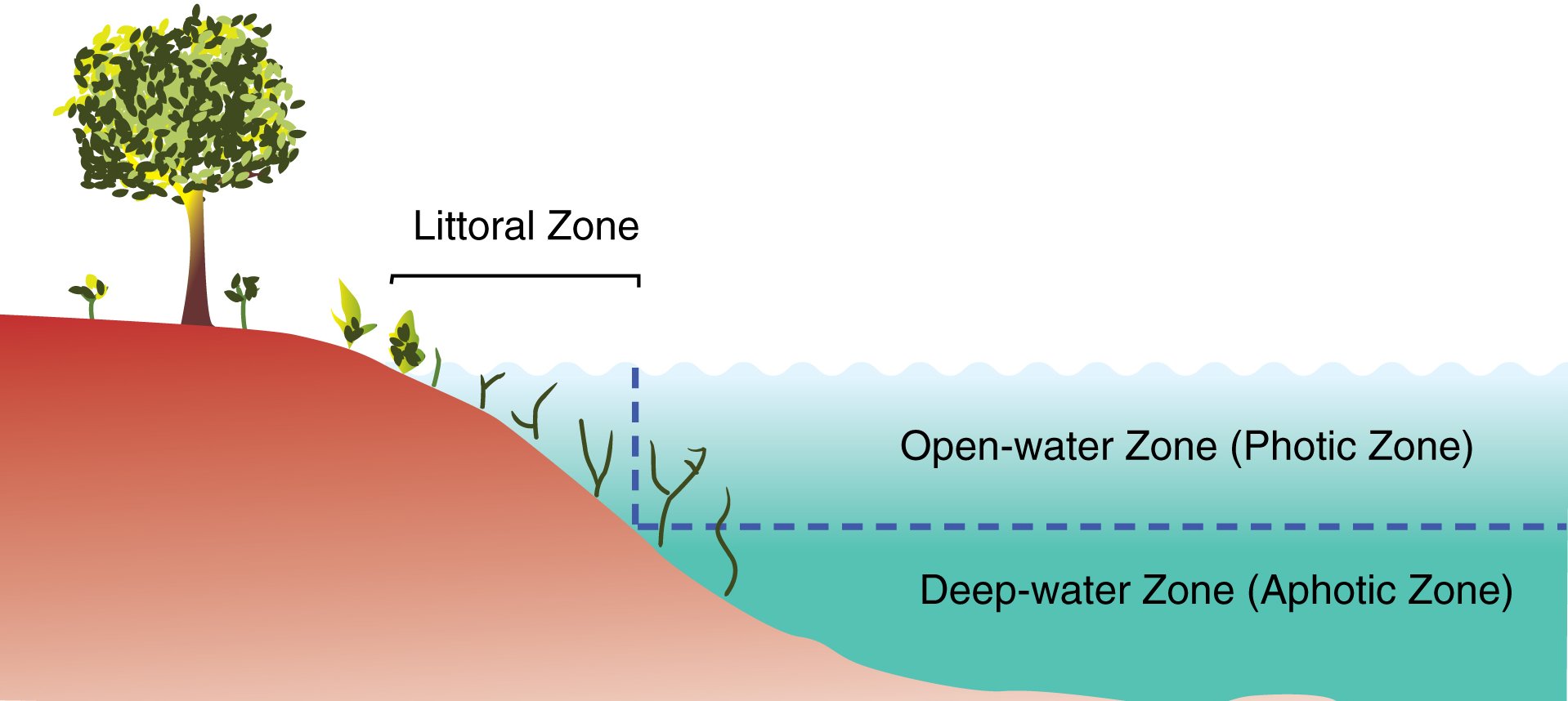
The three primary zones of a lake

A lake ecosystem or lacustrine ecosystem includes biotic (living) plants, animals and micro-organisms, as well as abiotic (non-living) physical and chemical interactions. Lake ecosystems are a prime example of lentic ecosystems (lentic refers to stationary or relatively still freshwater, from the Latin lentus, which means "sluggish"), which include ponds, lakes and wetlands, and much of this article applies to lentic ecosystems in general. Lentic ecosystems can be compared with lotic ecosystems, which involve flowing terrestrial waters such as rivers and streams. Together, these two ecosystems are examples of freshwater ecosystems.

Lentic systems are diverse, ranging from a small, temporary rainwater pool a few inches deep to Lake Baikal, which has a maximum depth of 1642 m. The general distinction between pools/ponds and lakes is vague, but Brown states that ponds and pools have their entire bottom surfaces exposed to light, while lakes do not. In addition, some lakes become seasonally stratified. Ponds and pools have two regions: the pelagic open water zone, and the benthic zone, which comprises the bottom and shore regions. Since lakes have deep bottom regions not exposed to light, these systems have an additional zone, the profundal. These three areas can have very different abiotic conditions and, hence, host species that are specifically adapted to live there.

Two important subclasses of lakes are ponds, which typically are small lakes that intergrade with wetlands, and water reservoirs. Over long periods of time, lakes, or bays within them, may gradually become enriched by nutrients and slowly fill in with organic sediments, a process called succession. When humans use the drainage basin, the volumes of sediment entering the lake can accelerate this process. The addition of sediments and nutrients to a lake is known as eutrophication.

== Zones ==
Lake ecosystems can be divided into zones. One common system divides lakes into three zones. The first, the littoral zone, is the shallow zone near the shore. This is where rooted wetland plants occur. The offshore is divided into two further zones, an open water zone and a deep water zone. In the open water zone (or photic zone) sunlight supports photosynthetic algae and the species that feed upon them. In the deep water zone, sunlight is not available and the food web is based on detritus entering from the littoral and photic zones. Some systems use other names. The off shore areas may be called the pelagic zone, the photic zone may be called the limnetic zone and the aphotic zone may be called the profundal zone. Inland from the littoral zone, one can also frequently identify a riparian zone which has plants still affected by the presence of the lake—this can include effects from windfalls, spring flooding, and winter ice damage. The production of the lake as a whole is the result of production from plants growing in the littoral zone, combined with production from plankton growing in the open water.

Wetlands can be part of the lentic system, as they form naturally along most lake shores, the width of the wetland and littoral zone being dependent upon the slope of the shoreline and the amount of natural change in water levels, within and among years. Often dead trees accumulate in this zone, either from windfalls on the shore or logs transported to the site during floods. This woody debris provides important habitat for fish and nesting birds, as well as protecting shorelines from erosion.

== Abiotic components ==
=== Light ===
Light provides the solar energy required to drive the process of photosynthesis, the major energy source of lentic systems. The amount of light received depends upon a combination of several factors. Small ponds may experience shading by surrounding trees, while cloud cover may affect light availability in all systems, regardless of size. Seasonal and diurnal considerations also play a role in light availability because the shallower the angle at which light strikes water, the more light is lost by reflection. This is known as Beer's law. Once light has penetrated the surface, it may also be scattered by particles suspended in the water column. This scattering decreases the total amount of light as depth increases. Lakes are divided into photic and aphotic regions, the prior receiving sunlight and latter being below the depths of light penetration, making it void of photosynthetic capacity. In relation to lake zonation, the pelagic and benthic zones are considered to lie within the photic region, while the profundal zone is in the aphotic region.

=== Temperature ===
Temperature is an important abiotic factor in lentic ecosystems because most of the biota are poikilothermic, where internal body temperatures are defined by the surrounding system. Water can be heated or cooled through radiation at the surface and conduction to or from the air and surrounding substrate. Shallow ponds often have a continuous temperature gradient from warmer waters at the surface to cooler waters at the bottom. In addition, temperature fluctuations can vary greatly in these systems, both diurnally and seasonally.

Temperature regimes are very different in large lakes. In temperate regions, for example, as air temperatures increase, the icy layer formed on the surface of the lake breaks up, leaving the water at approximately 4 °C. This is the temperature at which water has the highest density. As the season progresses, the warmer air temperatures heat the surface waters, making them less dense. The deeper waters remain cool and dense due to reduced light penetration. As the summer begins, two distinct layers become established, with such a large temperature difference between them that they remain stratified. The lowest zone in the lake is the coldest and is called the hypolimnion. The upper warm zone is called the epilimnion. Between these zones is a band of rapid temperature change called the thermocline. During the colder fall season, heat is lost at the surface and the epilimnion cools. When the temperatures of the two zones are close enough, the waters begin to mix again to create a uniform temperature, an event termed lake turnover. In the winter, inverse stratification occurs as water near the surface cools freezes, while warmer, but denser water remains near the bottom. A thermocline is established, and the cycle repeats.

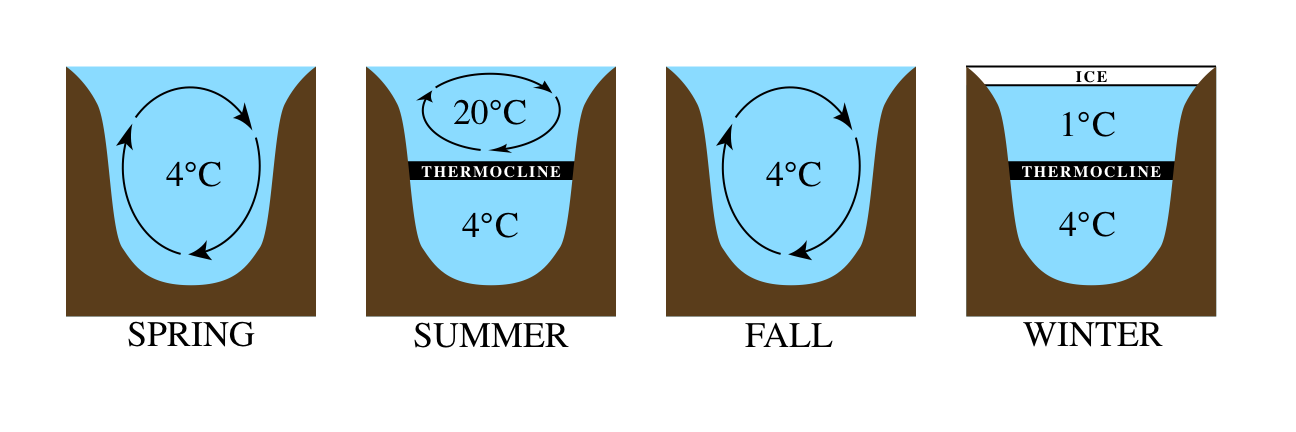
Seasonal stratification in temperate lakes

=== Wind ===
Illustration of Langmuir rotations; open circles=positively buoyant particles, closed circles=negatively buoyant particles.

In exposed systems, wind can create turbulent, spiral-formed surface currents called Langmuir circulations. Exactly how these currents become established is still not well understood, but it is evident that it involves some interaction between horizontal surface currents and surface gravity waves. The visible result of these rotations, which can be seen in any lake, are the surface foamlines that run parallel to the wind direction. Positively buoyant particles and small organisms concentrate in the foamline at the surface and negatively buoyant objects are found in the upwelling current between the two rotations. Objects with neutral buoyancy tend to be evenly distributed in the water column.

This turbulence circulates nutrients in the water column, making it crucial for many pelagic species, however its effect on benthic and profundal organisms is minimal to non-existent, respectively. The degree of nutrient circulation is system specific, as it depends upon such factors as wind strength and duration, as well as lake or pool depth and productivity.

=== Chemistry ===
Oxygen is essential for organismal respiration. The amount of oxygen present in standing waters depends upon: 1) the area of transparent water exposed to the air, 2) the circulation of water within the system and 3) the amount of oxygen generated and used by organisms present. In shallow, plant-rich pools there may be great fluctuations of oxygen, with extremely high concentrations occurring during the day due to photosynthesis and very low values at night when respiration is the dominant process of primary producers. Thermal stratification in larger systems can also affect the amount of oxygen present in different zones. The epilimnion is oxygen rich because it circulates quickly, gaining oxygen via contact with the air. The hypolimnion, however, circulates very slowly and has no atmospheric contact.

Additionally, fewer green plants exist in the hypolimnion, so there is less oxygen released from photosynthesis. In spring and fall when the epilimnion and hypolimnion mix, oxygen becomes more evenly distributed in the system. Low oxygen levels are characteristic of the profundal zone due to the accumulation of decaying vegetation and animal matter that “rains” down from the pelagic and benthic zones and the inability to support primary producers.

Phosphorus is important for all organisms because it is a component of DNA and RNA and is involved in cell metabolism as a component of ATP and ADP. Also, phosphorus is not found in large quantities in freshwater systems, limiting photosynthesis in primary producers, making it the main determinant of lentic system production. The phosphorus cycle is complex, but the model outlined below describes the basic pathways. Phosphorus mainly enters a pond or lake through runoff from the watershed or by atmospheric deposition. Upon entering the system, a reactive form of phosphorus is usually taken up by algae and macrophytes, which release a non-reactive phosphorus compound as a byproduct of photosynthesis. This phosphorus can drift downwards and become part of the benthic or profundal sediment, or it can be remineralized to the reactive form by microbes in the water column. Similarly, non-reactive phosphorus in the sediment can be remineralized into the reactive form. Sediments are generally richer in phosphorus than lake water, however, indicating that this nutrient may have a long residency time there before it is remineralized and re-introduced to the system.

== Biotic components ==
Co-occurrence network of a bacterial community in a lake

=== Bacteria ===
Bacteria are present in all regions of lentic waters. Free-living forms are associated with decomposing organic material, biofilm on the surfaces of rocks and plants, suspended in the water column, and in the sediments of the benthic and profundal zones. Other forms are also associated with the guts of lentic animals as parasites or in commensal relationships. Bacteria play an important role in system metabolism through nutrient recycling, which is discussed in the Trophic Relationships section.

=== Primary producers ===
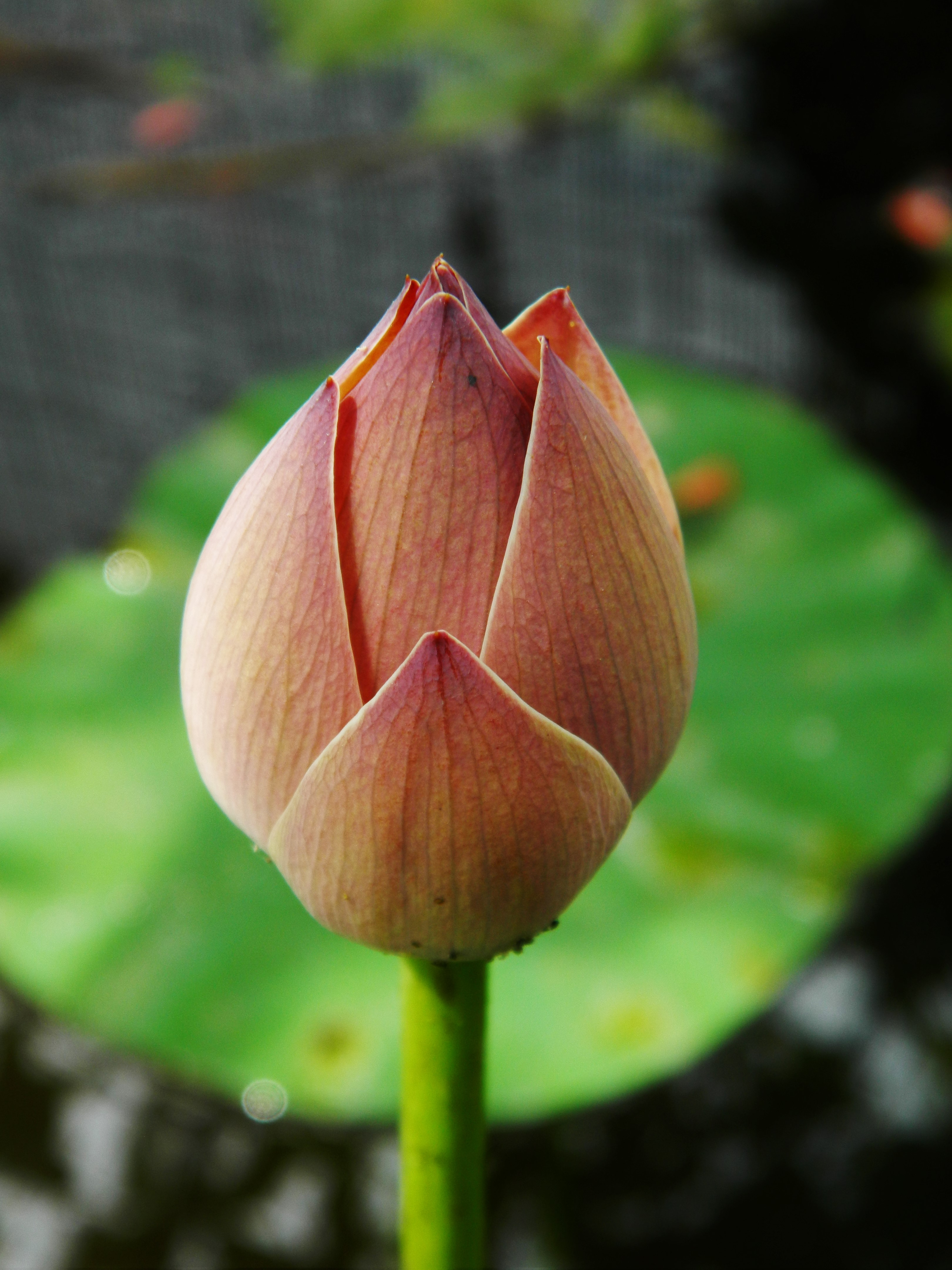
Nelumbo nucifera, an aquatic plant.

Algae, including both phytoplankton and periphyton, are the principle photosynthesizers in ponds and lakes. Phytoplankton are found drifting in the water column of the pelagic zone. Many species have a higher density than water, which should cause them to sink inadvertently down into the benthos. To combat this, phytoplankton have developed density-changing mechanisms, by forming vacuoles and gas vesicles, or by changing their shapes to induce drag, thus slowing their descent.

A very sophisticated adaptation utilized by a small number of species is a tail-like flagellum that can adjust vertical position, and allow movement in any direction. Phytoplankton can also maintain their presence in the water column by being circulated in Langmuir rotations. Periphytic algae, on the other hand, are attached to a substrate. In lakes and ponds, they can cover all benthic surfaces. Both types of plankton are important as food sources and as oxygen providers.

Aquatic plants live in both the benthic and pelagic zones, and can be grouped according to their manner of growth: ⑴ emergent = rooted in the substrate, but with leaves and flowers extending into the air; ⑵ floating-leaved = rooted in the substrate, but with floating leaves; ⑶ submersed = growing beneath the surface; ⑷ free-floating macrophytes = not rooted in the substrate, and floating on the surface. These various forms of macrophytes generally occur in different areas of the benthic zone, with emergent vegetation nearest the shoreline, then floating-leaved macrophytes, followed by submersed vegetation. Free-floating macrophytes can occur anywhere on the system's surface.

Aquatic plants are more buoyant than their terrestrial counterparts because freshwater has a higher density than air. This makes structural rigidity unimportant in lakes and ponds (except in the aerial stems and leaves). Thus, the leaves and stems of most aquatic plants use less energy to construct and maintain woody tissue, investing that energy into fast growth instead. In order to contend with stresses induced by the wind and waves, plants must be both flexible and tough. Light, water depth, and substrate types are the most important factors controlling the distribution of submerged aquatic plants. Macrophytes are sources of food, oxygen, and habitat structure in the benthic zone, but cannot penetrate the depths of the euphotic zone, and hence are not found there.

=== Invertebrates ===
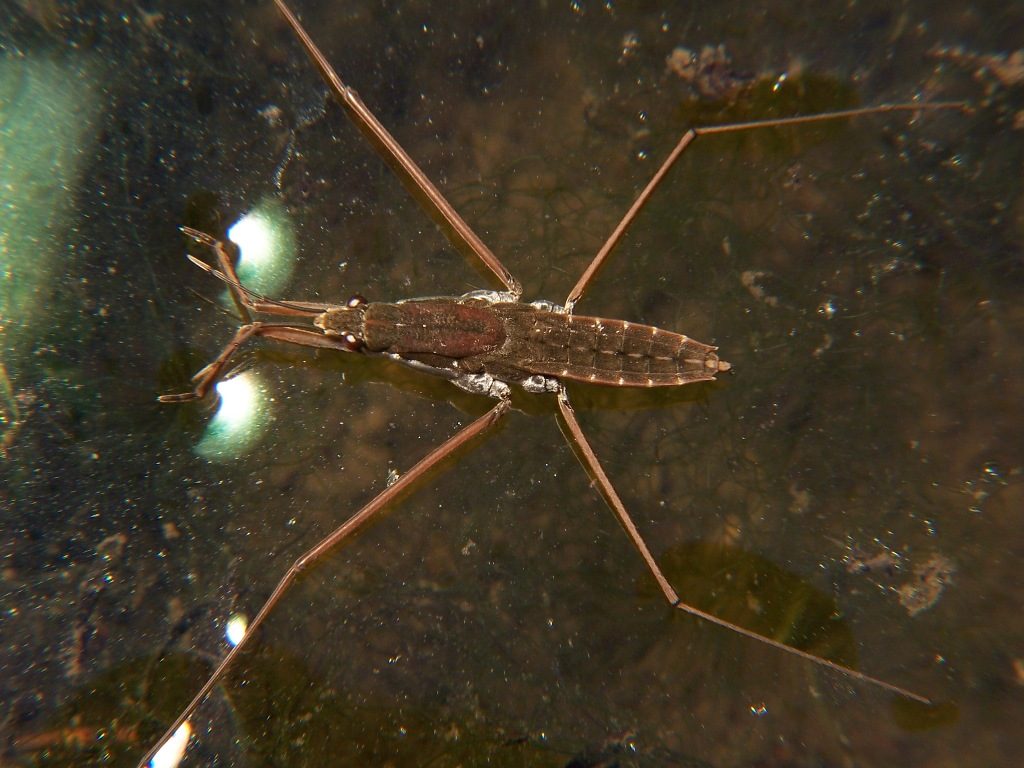
Water striders are predatory insects which rely on surface tension to walk on top of water. They live on the surface of ponds, marshes, and other quiet waters. They can move very quickly, up to 1.5 m/s.

Zooplankton are tiny animals suspended in the water column. Like phytoplankton, these species have developed mechanisms that keep them from sinking to deeper waters, including drag-inducing body forms, and the active flicking of appendages (such as antennae or spines). Remaining in the water column may have its advantages in terms of feeding, but this zone's lack of refugia leaves zooplankton vulnerable to predation. In response, some species, especially Daphnia sp., make daily vertical migrations in the water column by passively sinking to the darker lower depths during the day, and actively moving towards the surface during the night.

Also, because conditions in a lentic system can be quite variable across seasons, zooplankton have the ability to switch from laying regular eggs to resting eggs when there is a lack of food, temperatures fall below 2 °C, or if predator abundance is high. These resting eggs have a diapause, or dormancy period, that should allow the zooplankton to encounter conditions that are more favorable to survival when they finally hatch. The invertebrates that inhabit the benthic zone are numerically dominated by small species, and are species-rich compared to the zooplankton of the open water. They include: Crustaceans (e.g. crabs, crayfish, and shrimp), molluscs (e.g. clams and snails), and numerous types of insects. These organisms are mostly found in the areas of macrophyte growth, where the richest resources, highly-oxygenated water, and warmest portion of the ecosystem are found. The structurally diverse macrophyte beds are important sites for the accumulation of organic matter, and provide an ideal area for colonization. The sediments and plants also offer a great deal of protection from predatory fishes.

Very few invertebrates are able to inhabit the cold, dark, and oxygen-poor profundal zone. Those that can are often red in color, due to the presence of large amounts of hemoglobin, which greatly increases the amount of oxygen carried to cells. Because the concentration of oxygen within this zone is low, most species construct tunnels or burrows in which they can hide, and utilize the minimum amount of movements necessary to circulate water through, drawing oxygen to them without expending too much energy.

=== Fish and other vertebrates ===
Fish have a range of physiological tolerances that are dependent upon which species they belong to. They have different lethal temperatures, dissolved oxygen requirements, and spawning needs that are based on their activity levels and behaviors. Because fish are highly mobile, they are able to deal with unsuitable abiotic factors in one zone by simply moving to another. A detrital feeder in the profundal zone, for example, that finds the oxygen concentration has dropped too low may feed closer to the benthic zone. A fish might also alter its residence during different parts of its life history: hatching in a sediment nest, then moving to the weedy benthic zone to develop in a protected environment with food resources, and finally into the pelagic zone as an adult.

Other vertebrate taxa inhabit lentic systems as well. These include amphibians (e.g. salamanders and frogs), reptiles (e.g. snakes, turtles, and alligators), and a large number of waterfowl species. Most of these vertebrates spend part of their time in terrestrial habitats, and thus, are not directly affected by abiotic factors in the lake or pond. Many fish species are important both as consumers and as prey species to the larger vertebrates mentioned above.

== Trophic relationships ==
=== Primary producers ===
Lentic systems gain most of their energy from photosynthesis performed by aquatic plants and algae. This autochthonous process involves the combination of carbon dioxide, water, and solar energy to produce carbohydrates and dissolved oxygen. Within a lake or pond, the potential rate of photosynthesis generally decreases with depth due to light attenuation. Photosynthesis, however, is often low at the top few millimeters of the surface, likely due to inhibition by ultraviolet light. The exact depth and photosynthetic rate measurements of this curve are system-specific and depend upon: 1) the total biomass of photosynthesizing cells, 2) the amount of light attenuating materials, and 3) the abundance and frequency range of light absorbing pigments (i.e. chlorophylls) inside of photosynthesizing cells. The energy created by these primary producers is important for the community because it is transferred to higher trophic levels via consumption.

=== Bacteria ===
The vast majority of bacteria in lakes and ponds obtain their energy by decomposing vegetation and animal matter. In the pelagic zone, dead fish and the occasional allochthonous input of litterfall are examples of coarse particulate organic matter (CPOM>1 mm). Bacteria degrade these into fine particulate organic matter (FPOM<1 mm) and then further into usable nutrients. Small organisms such as plankton are also characterized as FPOM. Very low concentrations of nutrients are released during decomposition because the bacteria are utilizing them to build their own biomass. Bacteria, however, are consumed by protozoa, which are in turn consumed by zooplankton, and then further up the trophic levels. Elements other than carbon, particularly phosphorus and nitrogen, are regenerated when protozoa feed on bacterial prey and this way, nutrients become once more available for use in the water column. This regeneration cycle is known as the microbial loop and is a key component of lentic food webs.

The decomposition of organic materials can continue in the benthic and profundal zones if the matter falls through the water column before being completely digested by the pelagic bacteria. Bacteria are found in the greatest abundance here in sediments, where they are typically 2-1000 times more prevalent than in the water column.

=== Benthic invertebrates ===
Benthic invertebrates, due to their high level of species richness, have many methods of prey capture. Filter feeders create currents via siphons or beating cilia, to pull water and its nutritional contents, towards themselves for straining. Grazers use scraping, rasping, and shredding adaptations to feed on periphytic algae and macrophytes. Members of the collector guild browse the sediments, picking out specific particles with raptorial appendages. Deposit feeding invertebrates indiscriminately consume sediment, digesting any organic material it contains. Finally, some invertebrates belong to the predator guild, capturing and consuming living animals. The profundal zone is home to a unique group of filter feeders that use small body movements to draw a current through burrows that they have created in the sediment. This mode of feeding requires the least amount of motion, allowing these species to conserve energy. A small number of invertebrate taxa are predators in the profundal zone. These species are likely from other regions and only come to these depths to feed. The vast majority of invertebrates in this zone are deposit feeders, getting their energy from the surrounding sediments.

=== Fish ===
Fish size, mobility, and sensory capabilities allow them to exploit a broad prey base, covering multiple zonation regions. Like invertebrates, fish feeding habits can be categorized into guilds. In the pelagic zone, herbivores graze on periphyton and macrophytes or pick phytoplankton out of the water column. Carnivores include fishes that feed on zooplankton in the water column (zooplanktivores), insects at the water's surface, on benthic structures, or in the sediment (insectivores), and those that feed on other fish (piscivores). Fish that consume detritus and gain energy by processing its organic material are called detritivores. Omnivores ingest a wide variety of prey, encompassing floral, faunal, and detrital material. Finally, members of the parasitic guild acquire nutrition from a host species, usually another fish or large vertebrate. Fish taxa are flexible in their feeding roles, varying their diets with environmental conditions and prey availability. Many species also undergo a diet shift as they develop. Therefore, it is likely that any single fish occupies multiple feeding guilds within its lifetime.

=== Lentic food webs ===
As noted in the previous sections, the lentic biota are linked in complex web of trophic relationships. These organisms can be considered to loosely be associated with specific trophic groups (e.g. primary producers, herbivores, primary carnivores, secondary carnivores, etc.). Scientists have developed several theories in order to understand the mechanisms that control the abundance and diversity within these groups. Very generally, top-down processes dictate that the abundance of prey taxa is dependent upon the actions of consumers from higher trophic levels. Typically, these processes operate only between two trophic levels, with no effect on the others. In some cases, however, aquatic systems experience a trophic cascade; for example, this might occur if primary producers experience less grazing by herbivores because these herbivores are suppressed by carnivores. Bottom-up processes are functioning when the abundance or diversity of members of higher trophic levels is dependent upon the availability or quality of resources from lower levels. Finally, a combined regulating theory, bottom-up:top-down, combines the predicted influences of consumers and resource availability. It predicts that trophic levels close to the lowest trophic levels will be most influenced by bottom-up forces, while top-down effects should be strongest at top levels.

== Community patterns and diversity ==
=== Local species richness ===
The biodiversity of a lentic system increases with the surface area of the lake or pond. This is attributable to the higher likelihood of partly terrestrial species of finding a larger system. Also, because larger systems typically have larger populations, the chance of extinction is decreased. Additional factors, including temperature regime, pH, nutrient availability, habitat complexity, speciation rates, competition, and predation, have been linked to the number of species present within systems.

=== Succession patterns in plankton communities – the PEG model ===
Phytoplankton and zooplankton communities in lake systems undergo seasonal succession in relation to nutrient availability, predation, and competition. Sommer et al. described these patterns as part of the Plankton Ecology Group (PEG) model, with 24 statements constructed from the analysis of numerous systems. The following includes a subset of these statements, as explained by Brönmark and Hansson illustrating succession through a single seasonal cycle: Winter
1. Increased nutrient and light availability result in rapid phytoplankton growth towards the end of winter. The dominant species, such as diatoms, are small and have quick growth capabilities. 2. These plankton are consumed by zooplankton, which become the dominant plankton taxa. Spring
3. A clear water phase occurs, as phytoplankton populations become depleted due to increased predation by growing numbers of zooplankton. Summer
4. Zooplankton abundance declines as a result of decreased phytoplankton prey and increased predation by juvenile fishes.
5. With increased nutrient availability and decreased predation from zooplankton, a diverse phytoplankton community develops.
6. As the summer continues, nutrients become depleted in a predictable order: phosphorus, silica, and then nitrogen. The abundance of various phytoplankton species varies in relation to their biological need for these nutrients.
7. Small-sized zooplankton become the dominant type of zooplankton because they are less vulnerable to fish predation. Fall
8. Predation by fishes is reduced due to lower temperatures and zooplankton of all sizes increase in number. Winter
9. Cold temperatures and decreased light availability result in lower rates of primary production and decreased phytoplankton populations. 10. Reproduction in zooplankton decreases due to lower temperatures and less prey. The PEG model presents an idealized version of this succession pattern, while natural systems are known for their variation.

=== Latitudinal patterns ===
There is a well-documented global pattern that correlates decreasing plant and animal diversity with increasing latitude, that is to say, there are fewer species as one moves towards the poles. The cause of this pattern is one of the greatest puzzles for ecologists today. Theories for its explanation include energy availability, climatic variability, disturbance, competition, etc. Despite this global diversity gradient, this pattern can be weak for freshwater systems compared to global marine and terrestrial systems. This may be related to size, as Hillebrand and Azovsky found that smaller organisms (protozoa and plankton) did not follow the expected trend strongly, while larger species (vertebrates) did. They attributed this to better dispersal ability by smaller organisms, which may result in high distributions globally.

== Natural lake lifecycles ==
=== Lake creation ===
Lakes can be formed in a variety of ways, but the most common are discussed briefly below. The oldest and largest systems are the result of tectonic activities. The rift lakes in Africa, for example are the result of seismic activity along the site of separation of two tectonic plates. Ice-formed lakes are created when glaciers recede, leaving behind abnormalities in the landscape shape that are then filled with water. Finally, oxbow lakes are fluvial in origin, resulting when a meandering river bend is pinched off from the main channel.

=== Natural extinction ===
All lakes and ponds receive sediment inputs. Since these systems are not really expanding, it is logical to assume that they will become increasingly shallower in depth, eventually becoming wetlands or terrestrial vegetation. The length of this process should depend upon a combination of depth and sedimentation rate. Moss gives the example of Lake Tanganyika, which reaches a depth of 1500 m and has a sedimentation rate of 0.5 mm/yr. Assuming that sedimentation is not influenced by anthropogenic factors, this system should go extinct in approximately 3 million years. Shallow lentic systems might also fill in as swamps encroach inward from the edges. These processes operate on a much shorter timescale, taking hundreds to thousands of years to complete the extinction process.

== Human impacts ==
=== Acidification ===
Sulfur dioxide and nitrogen oxides are naturally released from volcanoes, organic compounds in the soil, wetlands, and marine systems, but the majority of these compounds come from the combustion of coal, oil, gasoline, and the smelting of ores containing sulfur. These substances dissolve in atmospheric moisture and enter lentic systems as acid rain. Lakes and ponds that contain bedrock that is rich in carbonates have a natural buffer, resulting in no alteration of pH. Systems without this bedrock, however, are very sensitive to acid inputs because they have a low neutralizing capacity, resulting in pH declines even with only small inputs of acid. At a pH of 5–6 algal species diversity and biomass decrease considerably, leading to an increase in water transparency – a characteristic feature of acidified lakes. As the pH continues lower, all fauna becomes less diverse. The most significant feature is the disruption of fish reproduction. Thus, the population is eventually composed of few, old individuals that eventually die and leave the systems without fishes. Acid rain has been especially harmful to lakes in Scandinavia, western Scotland, west Wales and the north eastern United States.

=== Eutrophication ===
Eutrophic systems contain a high concentration of phosphorus (~30 μg/L), nitrogen (~1500 μg/L), or both. Phosphorus enters lentic waters from sewage treatment effluents, discharge from raw sewage, or from runoff of farmland. Nitrogen mostly comes from agricultural fertilizers from runoff or leaching and subsequent groundwater flow. This increase in nutrients required for primary producers results in a massive increase of phytoplankton growth, termed a "plankton bloom." This bloom decreases water transparency, leading to the loss of submerged plants. The resultant reduction in habitat structure has negative impacts on the species that utilize it for spawning, maturation, and general survival. Additionally, the large number of short-lived phytoplankton result in a massive amount of dead biomass settling into the sediment.

Bacteria need large amounts of oxygen to decompose this material, thus reducing the oxygen concentration of the water. This is especially pronounced in stratified lakes, when the thermocline prevents oxygen-rich water from the surface to mix with lower levels. Low or anoxic conditions preclude the existence of many taxa that are not physiologically tolerant of these conditions.

=== Invasive species ===
Invasive species have been introduced to lentic systems through both purposeful events (e.g. stocking game and food species) as well as unintentional events (e.g. in ballast water). These organisms can affect natives via competition for prey or habitat, predation, habitat alteration, hybridization, or the introduction of harmful diseases and parasites. With regard to native species, invaders may cause changes in size and age structure, distribution, density, population growth, and may even drive populations to extinction. Examples of prominent invaders of lentic systems include the zebra mussel and sea lamprey in the Great Lakes.

== See also ==
- Freshwater environmental quality parameters
- Lake aeration
- Limnology
- Man-made lentic water bodies of Maharashtra
- Ecological release
