= Freshwater ecosystem =

Part of Earth's aquatic ecosystems

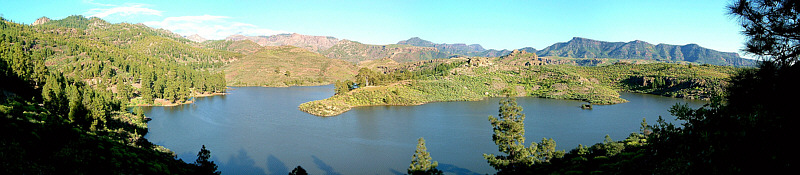
Freshwater ecosystem

Freshwater ecosystems are a subset of Earth's aquatic ecosystems that include the biological communities inhabiting freshwater waterbodies such as lakes, ponds, rivers, streams, springs, bogs, and wetlands. They can be contrasted with marine ecosystems, which have a much higher salinity. Freshwater habitats can be classified by different factors, including temperature, light penetration, nutrients, and vegetation.

There are three basic types of freshwater ecosystems: lentic (slow moving water, including pools, ponds, and lakes), lotic (faster moving streams, for example creeks and rivers) and wetlands (semi-aquatic areas where the soil is saturated or inundated for at least part of the time). Freshwater ecosystems contain 41% of the world's known fish species.

Freshwater ecosystems have undergone substantial transformations over time, which has impacted various characteristics of the ecosystems. Original attempts to understand and monitor freshwater ecosystems were spurred on by threats to human health (for example cholera outbreaks due to sewage contamination). Early monitoring focused on chemical indicators, then bacteria, and finally algae, fungi and protozoa. A new type of monitoring involves quantifying differing groups of organisms (macroinvertebrates, macrophytes and fish) and measuring the stream conditions associated with them.

Threats to freshwater biodiversity include overexploitation, water pollution, flow modification, destruction or degradation of habitat, and invasion by exotic species. Climate change is putting further pressure on these ecosystems because water temperatures have already increased by about 1 °C, and there have been significant declines in ice coverage which have caused subsequent ecosystem stresses.

== Types ==
There are three basic types of freshwater ecosystems: Lentic (slow moving water, including pools, ponds, and lakes), lotic (faster moving water, for example streams and rivers) and wetlands (areas where the soil is saturated or inundated for at least part of the time). Limnology (and its branch freshwater biology) is the study of freshwater ecosystems.

=== Lotic ecosystems ===
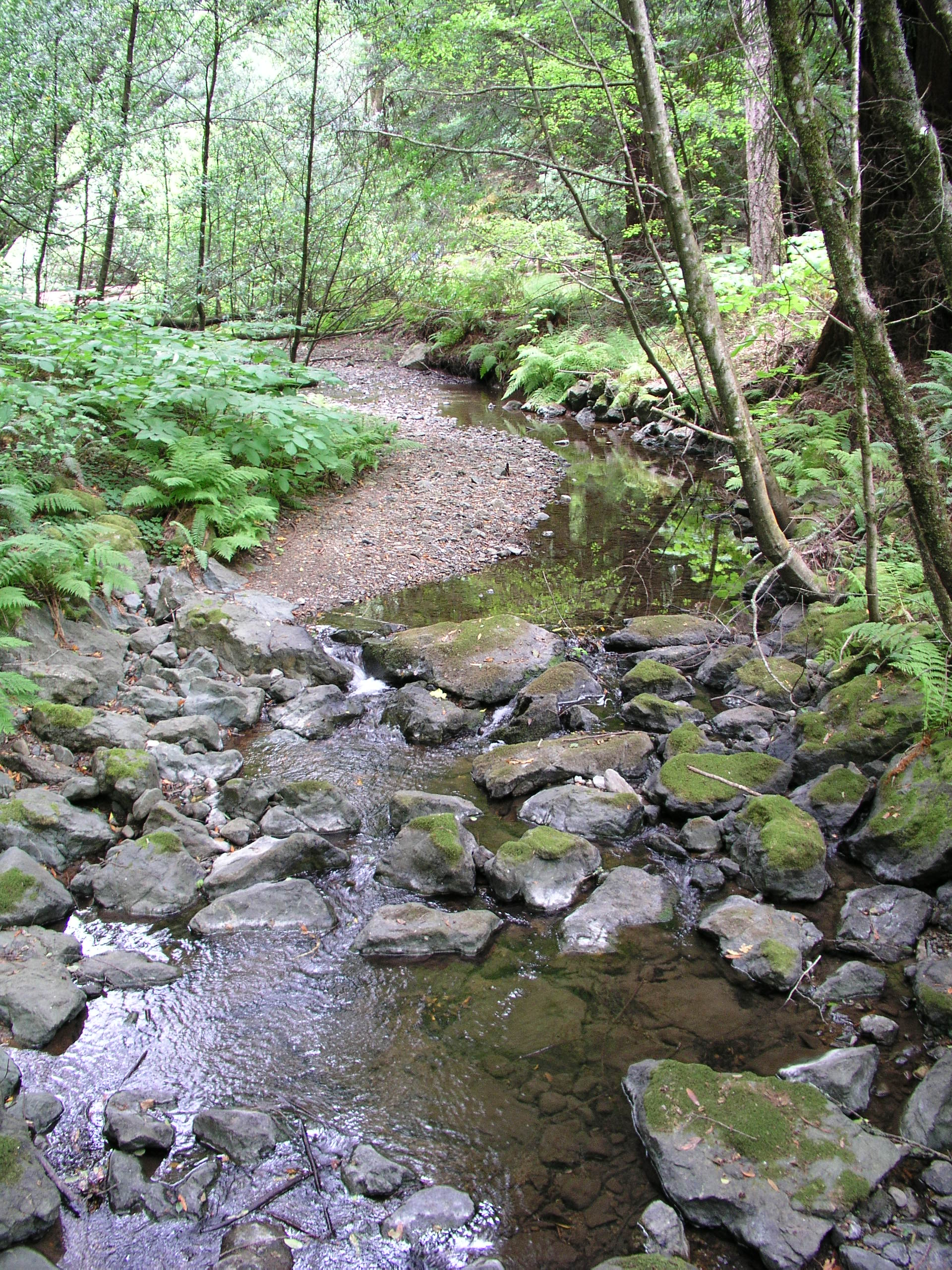
This stream operating together with its environment can be thought of as forming a river ecosystem.

River ecosystems are flowing waters that drain the landscape, and include the biotic (living) interactions amongst plants, animals and micro-organisms, as well as abiotic (nonliving) physical and chemical interactions of its many parts. River ecosystems are part of larger watershed networks or catchments, where smaller headwater streams drain into mid-size streams, which progressively drain into larger river networks. The major zones in river ecosystems are determined by the river bed's gradient or by the velocity of the current. Faster moving turbulent water typically contains greater concentrations of dissolved oxygen, which supports greater biodiversity than the slow-moving water of pools. These distinctions form the basis for the division of rivers into upland and lowland rivers.

The food base of streams within riparian forests is mostly derived from the trees, but wider streams and those that lack a canopy derive the majority of their food base from algae. Anadromous fish are also an important source of nutrients. Environmental threats to rivers include loss of water, dams, chemical pollution and introduced species. A dam produces negative effects that continue down the watershed. The most important negative effects are the reduction of spring flooding, which damages wetlands, and the retention of sediment, which leads to the loss of deltaic wetlands.

River ecosystems are prime examples of lotic ecosystems. Lotic refers to flowing water, from the Latin lotus, meaning washed. Lotic waters range from springs only a few centimeters wide to major rivers kilometers in width. Much of this article applies to lotic ecosystems in general, including related lotic systems such as streams and springs. Lotic ecosystems can be contrasted with lentic ecosystems, which involve relatively still terrestrial waters such as lakes, ponds, and wetlands. Lentic comes from the Latin lenis, meaning calm. Together, these two ecosystems form the more general study area of freshwater or aquatic ecology. There is no sharp boundary between the two systems, however.

=== Wetlands ===
A wetland is a distinct semi-aquatic ecosystem whose groundcovers are flooded or saturated in water, either permanently, for years or decades, or only seasonally. Flooding results in oxygen-poor (anoxic) processes taking place, especially in the soils. Wetlands form a transitional zone between waterbodies and dry lands, and are different from other terrestrial or aquatic ecosystems due to their vegetation's roots having adapted to oxygen-poor waterlogged soils. They are considered among the most biologically diverse of all ecosystems, serving as habitats to a wide range of aquatic and semi-aquatic plants and animals, with often improved water quality due to plant removal of excess nutrients such as nitrates and phosphorus.

Wetlands exist on every continent, except Antarctica. The water in wetlands is either freshwater, brackish or saltwater. Common types of wetlands are described based on the dominant plants and the source of the water. For example, marshes are wetlands dominated by emergent herbaceous vegetation such as reeds, cattails, and sedges. Swamps are dominated by woody vegetation, such as trees and shrubs (although reed swamps in Europe are dominated by reeds, not trees). Mangrove forests are wetlands with mangroves and halophytic woody plants that have evolved to tolerate salty water.

Examples of wetlands classified by the sources of water include tidal wetlands, where the water source is ocean tides; estuaries, water source is mixed tidal and river waters; floodplains, water source is excess water from overflowed rivers or lakes; and bogs and vernal ponds, water source is rainfall or meltwater, sometimes mediated through groundwater springs. The world's largest wetlands include the Amazon River basin, the West Siberian Plain, the Pantanal in South America, and the Sundarbans in the Ganges-Brahmaputra delta.

== Threats ==
=== Biodiversity ===
Five broad threats to freshwater biodiversity include overexploitation, water pollution, flow modification, destruction or degradation of habitat, and invasion by exotic species. Recent extinction trends can be attributed largely to sedimentation, stream fragmentation, chemical and organic pollutants, dams, and invasive species. Common chemical stresses on freshwater ecosystem health include acidification, eutrophication and copper and pesticide contamination.

Freshwater biodiversity faces many threats. The World Wide Fund for Nature's Living Planet Index noted an 83% decline in the populations of freshwater vertebrates between 1970 and 2014. These declines continue to outpace contemporaneous declines in marine or terrestrial systems. The causes of these declines are related to:

1. A rapidly changing climate
2. Online wildlife trade and invasive species
3. Infectious disease
4. Toxic algae blooms
5. Hydropower damming and fragmenting of half the world's rivers
6. Emerging contaminants, such as hormones
7. Engineered nanomaterials
8. Microplastic pollution
9. Light and noise interference
10. Saltier coastal freshwaters due to sea level rise
11. Calcium concentrations falling below the needs of some freshwater organisms
12. The additive—and possibly synergistic—effects of these threats

=== Invasive species ===
Invasive plants and animals are a major issue to freshwater ecosystems, in many cases outcompeting native species and altering water conditions. Introduced species are especially devastating to ecosystems that are home to endangered species. An example of this being the Asian carp competing with the paddlefish in the Mississippi river. Common causes of invasive species in freshwater ecosystems include aquarium releases, introduction for sport fishing, and introduction for use as a food fish.

=== Extinction of freshwater fauna ===
Over 123 freshwater fauna species have gone extinct in North America since 1900. Of North American freshwater species, an estimated 48.5% of mussels, 22.8% of gastropods, 32.7% of crayfishes, 25.9% of amphibians, and 21.2% of fish are either endangered or threatened. Extinction rates of many species may increase severely into the next century because of invasive species, loss of keystone species, and species which are already functionally extinct (e.g., species which are not reproducing). Even using conservative estimates, freshwater fish extinction rates in North America are 877 times higher than background extinction rates (1 in 3,000,000 years). Projected extinction rates for freshwater animals are around five times greater than for land animals, and are comparable to the rates for rainforest communities. Given the dire state of freshwater biodiversity, a team of scientists and practitioners from around the globe recently drafted an Emergency Action plan to try and restore freshwater biodiversity.

Current freshwater biomonitoring techniques focus primarily on community structure, but some programs measure functional indicators like biochemical (or biological) oxygen demand, sediment oxygen demand, and dissolved oxygen. Macroinvertebrate community structure is commonly monitored because of the diverse taxonomy, ease of collection, sensitivity to a range of stressors, and overall value to the ecosystem. Additionally, algal community structure (often using diatoms) is measured in biomonitoring programs. Algae are also taxonomically diverse, easily collected, sensitive to a range of stressors, and overall valuable to the ecosystem. Algae grow very quickly and communities may represent fast changes in environmental conditions.

In addition to community structure, responses to freshwater stressors are investigated by experimental studies that measure organism behavioural changes, altered rates of growth, reproduction or mortality. Experimental results on single species under controlled conditions may not always reflect natural conditions and multi-species communities.

The use of reference sites is common when defining the idealized "health" of a freshwater ecosystem. Reference sites can be selected spatially by choosing sites with minimal impacts from human disturbance and influence. However, reference conditions may also be established temporally by using preserved indicators such as diatom valves, macrophyte pollen, insect chitin and fish scales can be used to determine conditions prior to large scale human disturbance. These temporal reference conditions are often easier to reconstruct in standing water than moving water because stable sediments can better preserve biological indicator materials.

=== Climate change ===
The effects of climate change greatly complicate and frequently exacerbate the impacts of other stressors that threaten many fish, invertebrates, phytoplankton, and other organisms. Climate change is increasing the average temperature of water bodies, and worsening other issues such as changes in substrate composition, oxygen concentration, and other system changes that have ripple effects on the biology of the system. Water temperatures have already increased by around 1 °C, and significant declines in ice coverage have caused subsequent ecosystem stresses.

== See also ==
- Ecology
- Freshwater
