= Littoral zone =

Part of a sea, lake, or river that is close to the shore

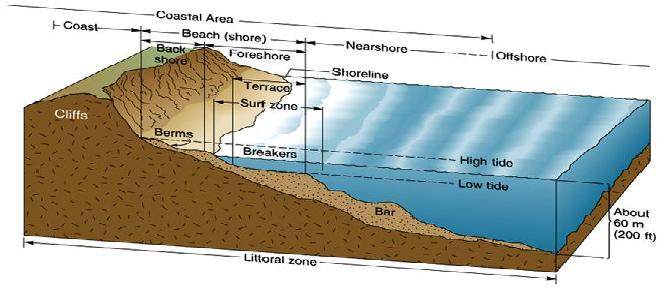
Different disciplines and agencies divide the littoral zone into different subregions, according to how they want to view the zone.

The littoral zone, also called litoral or nearshore, is the part of an ocean, sea, lake, or river, that is close to the shore. It provides extensive and productive habitats around the world, adjacent to land-water interfaces.

In coastal ecology, the littoral zone includes the foreshore (intertidal zone) extending from the high water mark (which is rarely inundated) to the low water mark (where coastal areas become permanently submerged). However, the geographical meaning of littoral zone extends well beyond the intertidal zone to include all neritic waters within the bounds of continental shelves. Continental shelves cover an area of about 7% of the surface area of the oceans.

In lake ecosystems, the littoral zone covers about 78% of Earth's total lake area. These zones support abundant plant growth, making them not only structurally distinct from the pelagic (open water) zone but also highly productive. Productivity in both marine and lake littoral zones can reach levels comparable to tropical rainforests.

== Definitions and characteristics ==
The littoral zone has no single definition. What is regarded as the full extent of the littoral zone, and the way the littoral zone is divided into subregions, varies in different contexts. For lakes, the littoral zone is the nearshore habitat where photosynthetically active radiation penetrates to the lake bottom in sufficient quantities to support photosynthesis. Along marine coastlines, the littoral zone can extend to the edge of the continental shelf, where water can be sufficiently shallow to allow photosynthesis.

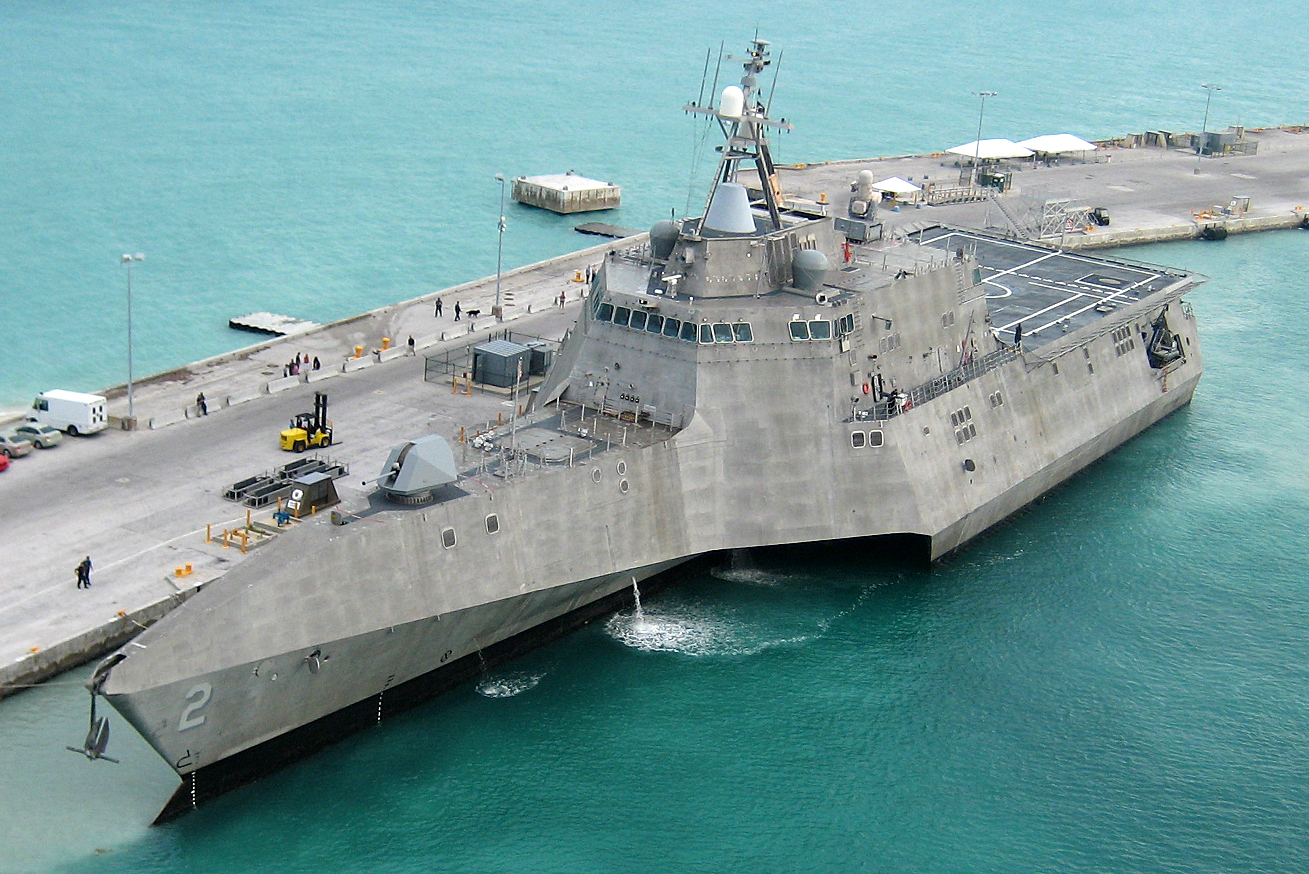
Littoral combat ship USS Independence, specialized for littoral warfare in shallow coastal waters

The use of the term varies from one part of the world to another, and between different disciplines. For example, military commanders speak of the littoral in ways that are quite different from the definition used by marine biologists. For the purposes of naval operations, the US Navy divides the littoral zone in the ways shown on the diagram at the top of this article. The US Army Corps of Engineers and the US Environmental Protection Agency have their own definitions, which have legal implications. The UK Ministry of Defence defines the littoral as those land areas (and their adjacent areas and associated air space) that are susceptible to engagement and influence from the sea.

The adjacency of water gives a number of distinctive characteristics to littoral regions. The erosive power of water results in particular types of landforms, such as sand dunes, and estuaries. The natural movement of the littoral along the coast is called the littoral drift. Biologically, the ready availability of water enables a greater variety of plant and animal life, and particularly the formation of extensive wetlands. In addition, the additional local humidity due to evaporation usually creates a microclimate supporting unique types of organisms.

The word littoral may be used both as a noun and as an adjective. It derives from the Latin noun litus, litoris, meaning "shore". (The doubled t is a late-medieval innovation, and the word is sometimes seen in the more classical-looking spelling litoral.)

== In oceanography and marine biology ==
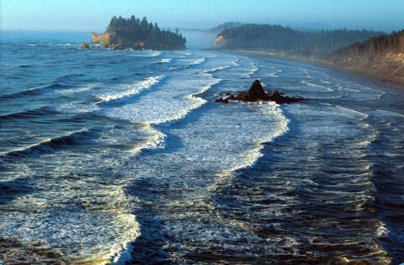
The littoral zone of an ocean is the area close to the shore and extending out to the edge of the continental shelf.

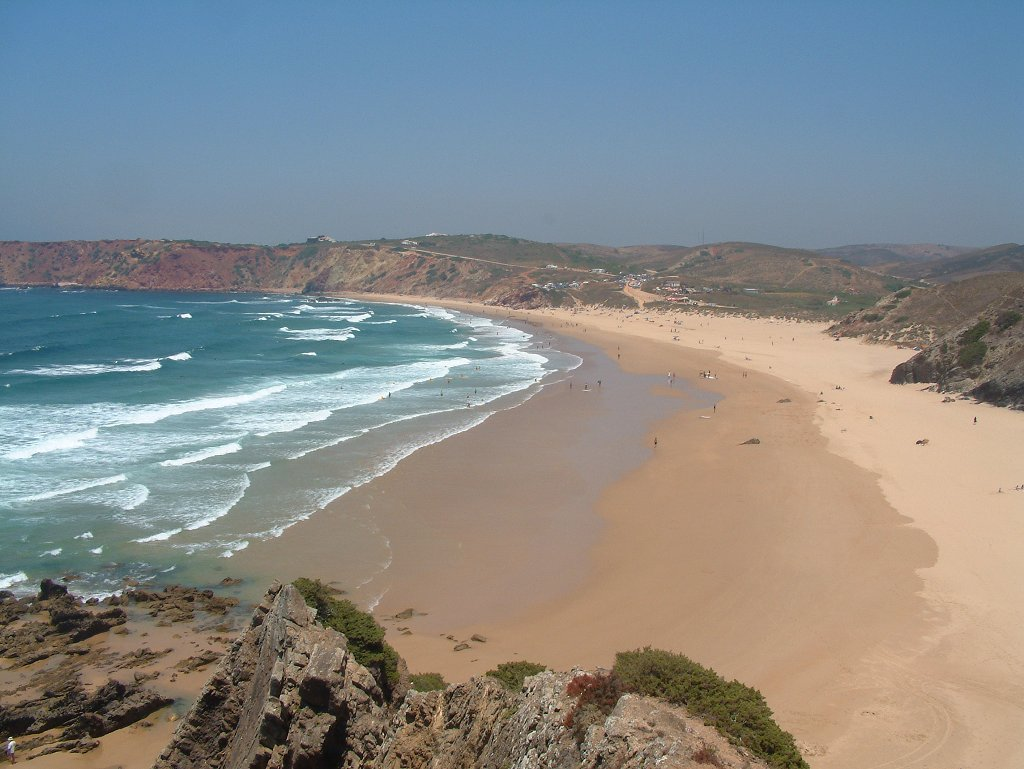
The intertidal zone of a beach is also part of the littoral zone.

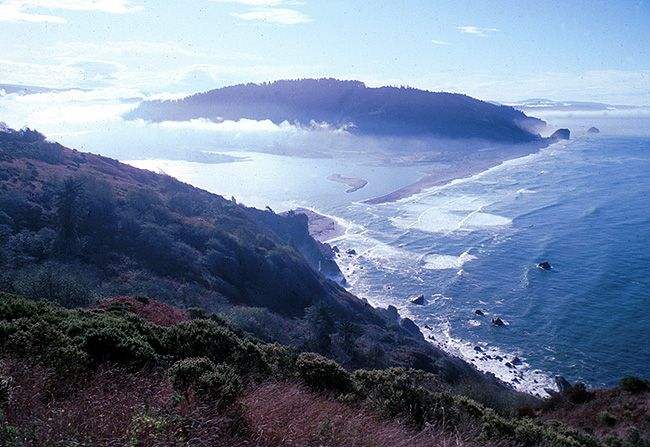
Estuaries are also in the littoral zone.

In oceanography and marine biology, the idea of the littoral zone is extended roughly to the edge of the continental shelf. Starting from the shoreline, the littoral zone begins at the spray region just above the high tide mark. From here, it moves to the intertidal region between the high and low water marks, and then out as far as the edge of the continental shelf. These three subregions are called, in order, the supralittoral zone, the eulittoral zone, and the sublittoral zone.

=== Supralittoral zone ===
The supralittoral zone (also called the splash, spray or supratidal zone) is the area above the spring high tide line that is regularly splashed, but not submerged by ocean water. Seawater penetrates these elevated areas only during storms with high tides. Organisms that live here must cope with exposure to fresh water from rain, cold, heat, dryness and predation by land animals and seabirds. At the top of this area, patches of dark lichens can appear as crusts on rocks. Some types of periwinkles, Neritidae and detritus feeding Isopods commonly inhabit the lower supralittoral.

=== Eulittoral zone ===
The eulittoral zone (also called the midlittoral or mediolittoral zone) is the intertidal zone, known also as the foreshore. It extends from the spring high tide line, which is rarely inundated, to the spring low tide line, which is rarely not inundated. It is alternately exposed and submerged once or twice daily. Organisms living here must be able to withstand the varying conditions of temperature, light, and salinity. Despite this, productivity is high in this zone. The wave action and turbulence of recurring tides shape and reform cliffs, gaps and caves, offering a huge range of habitats for sedentary organisms. Protected rocky shorelines usually show a narrow, almost homogenous, eulittoral strip, often marked by the presence of barnacles. Exposed sites show a wider extension and are often divided into further zones. For more on this, see intertidal ecology.

=== Sublittoral zone ===
The sublittoral zone starts immediately below the eulittoral zone. This zone is permanently covered with seawater and is approximately equivalent to the neritic zone.

In physical oceanography, the sublittoral zone refers to coastal regions with significant tidal flows and energy dissipation, including non-linear flows, internal waves, river outflows and oceanic fronts. In practice, this typically extends to the edge of the continental shelf, with depths around 200 meters.

In marine biology, the sublittoral zone refers to the areas where sunlight reaches the ocean floor, that is, where the water is never so deep as to take it out of the photic zone. This results in high primary production and makes the sublittoral zone the location of the majority of sea life. As in physical oceanography, this zone typically extends to the edge of the continental shelf. The benthic zone in the sublittoral is much more stable than in the intertidal zone; Temperature, water pressure, and the amount of sunlight remain fairly constant. Sublittoral corals do not have to deal with as much change as intertidal corals. Corals can live in both zones, but they are more common in the sublittoral zone.

Within the sublittoral, marine biologists also identify the following:

- The infralittoral zone is the algal dominated zone, which may extend to five metres below the low water mark.
- The circalittoral zone is the region beyond the infralittoral, that is, below the algal zone and dominated by sessile animals such as mussels and oysters.

Shallower regions of the sublittoral zone, extending not far from the shore, are sometimes referred to as the subtidal zone.

== In freshwater ecosystems ==
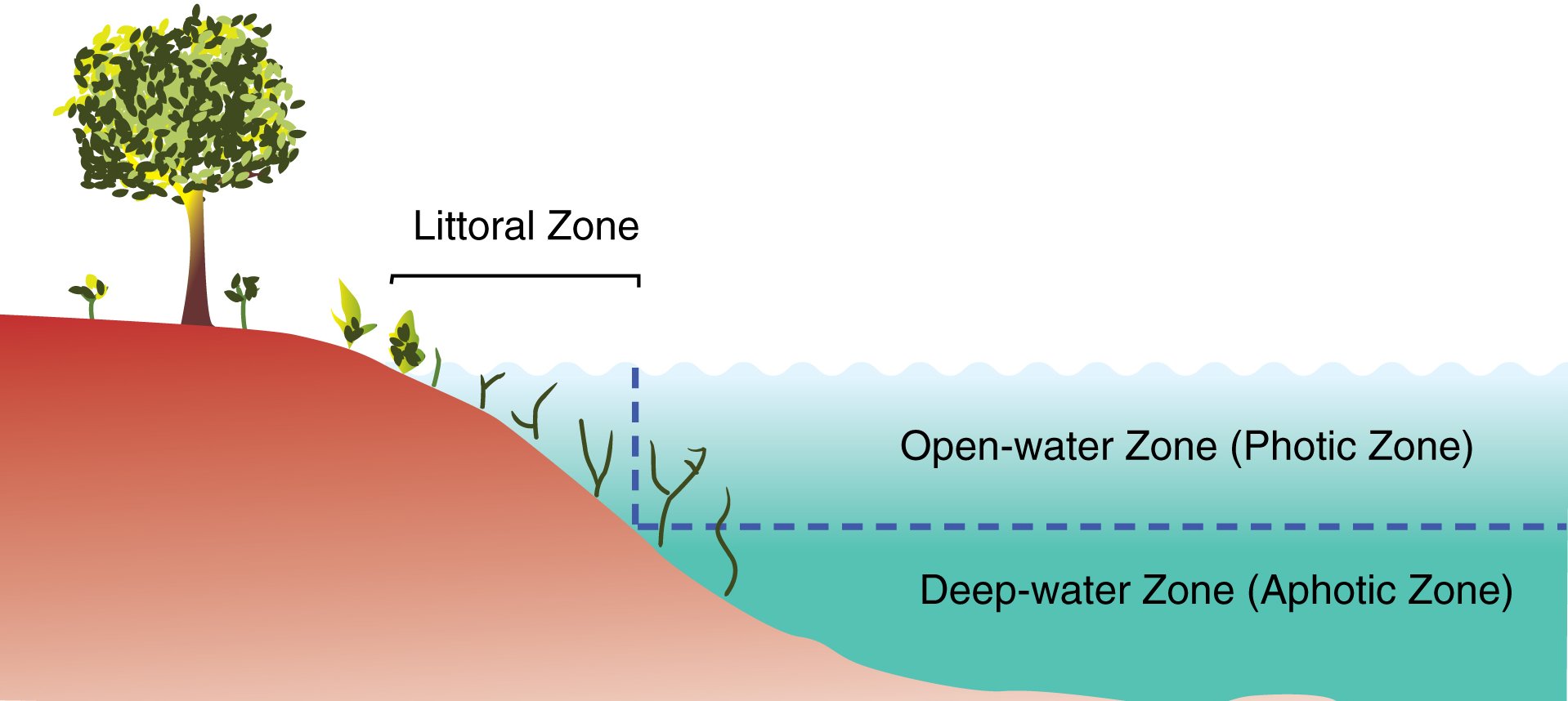
The three primary zones of a lake are the littoral zone, the open-water (also called the photic or limnetic) zone, and the deep-water (also called the aphotic or profundal) zone.

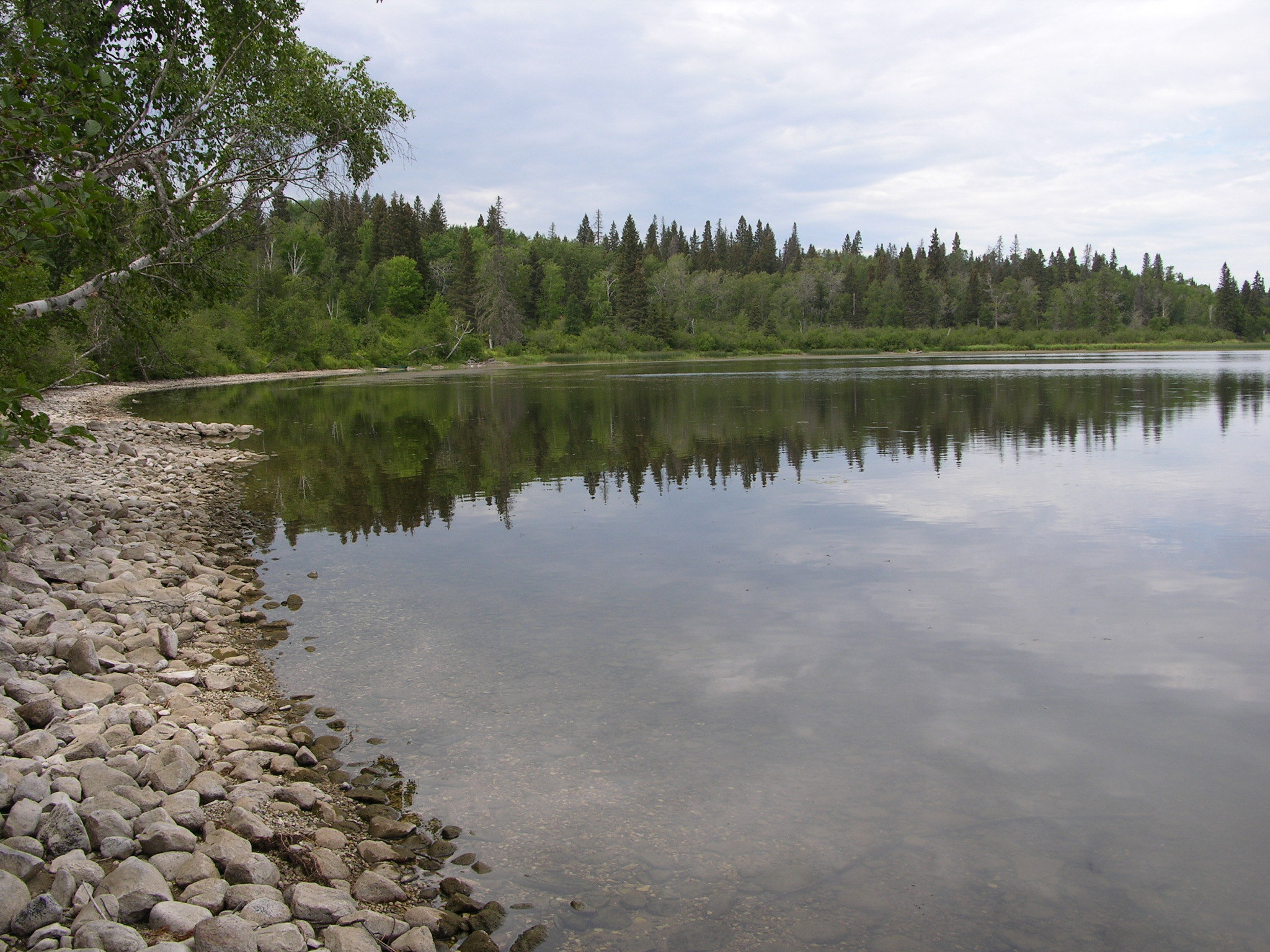
Shoreline of a lake with nearly unvegetated littoral zone

In freshwater situations, the littoral zone is the nearshore habitat where photosynthetically active radiation penetrates to the lake bottom in sufficient quantities to support photosynthesis. Sometimes other definitions are used. For example, the Minnesota Department of Natural Resources defines littoral as that portion of the lake that is less than 15 feet in depth. Such fixed-depth definitions often do not accurately represent the true ecological zonation, but are sometimes used because they are simple measurements to make bathymetric maps or when there are no measurements of light penetration. The littoral zone comprises an estimated 78% of Earth's total lake area.

The littoral zone may form a narrow or broad fringing wetland, with extensive areas of aquatic plants sorted by their tolerance to different water depths. Typically, four zones are recognized, from higher to lower on the shore: wooded wetland, wet meadow, marsh and aquatic vegetation. The relative areas of these four types depend not only on the profile of the shoreline, but upon past water levels. The area of wet meadow is particularly dependent upon past water levels; in general, the area of wet meadows along lakes and rivers increases with natural water level fluctuations. Many of the animals in lakes and rivers are dependent upon the wetlands of littoral zones, since the rooted plants provide habitat and food. Hence, a large and productive littoral zone is considered an important characteristic of a healthy lake or river.

The littoral zone of lakes is typically inhabited by macrophytes (freshwater aquatic plants). These macrophytes include: emergent macrophytes with stalks and leaves extending above the water surface, floating-leaved macrophytes rooted in the lakebed, free-floating macrophytes drifting on the surface, and submerged macrophytes growing entirely below the water surface. The distribution of macrophytes, especially submerged macrophytes, indicates the extent of the littoral zone. However, some areas of the littoral zone may remain unvegetated when environmental conditions are unfavorable for plant growth, such as when the substrate is unsuitable, light penetration is insufficient, or wave action is too strong. The macrophytes that typically grow in the littoral zone contribute to making littoral zones among the world's most productive habitats and can therefore play an important role in the global climate, for example by functioning as a carbon sink.

Littoral zones are at particular risk for two reasons. First, human settlement is often attracted to shorelines, and settlement often disrupts breeding habitats for littoral zone species. For example, many turtles are killed on roads when they leave the water to lay their eggs in upland sites. Fish can be negatively affected by docks and retaining walls which remove breeding habitat in shallow water. Some shoreline communities even deliberately try to remove wetlands since they may interfere with activities like swimming. Overall, the presence of human settlement has a demonstrated negative impact upon adjoining wetlands. An equally serious problem is the tendency to stabilize lake or river levels with dams. Dams remove the spring flood, which carries nutrients into littoral zones and reduces the natural fluctuation of water levels upon which many wetland plants and animals depend. Hence, over time, dams can reduce the area of wetland from a broad littoral zone to a narrow band of vegetation. Marshes and wet meadows are at particular risk.

== Habitats in littoral zones ==
Many vertebrates (e.g., mammals, waterfowl, reptiles) and invertebrates (insects, etc.) use both the littoral zone as well as the terrestrial ecosystem for food and habitat. Biota that are commonly assumed to reside in the pelagic zone often rely heavily on resources from the littoral zone. Littoral areas of ponds and lakes are typically better oxygenated, structurally more complex, and afford more abundant and diverse food resources than do profundal sediments. All these factors lead to a high diversity of insects and very complex trophic interactions.

The great lakes of the world represent a global heritage of surface freshwater and aquatic biodiversity. Species lists for 14 of the world's largest lakes reveal that 15% of the global diversity (the total number of species) of freshwater fishes, 9% of non-insect freshwater invertebrate diversity, and 2% of aquatic insect diversity live in this handful of lakes. The vast majority (more than 93%) of species inhabit the shallow, nearshore littoral zone, and 72% are completely restricted to the littoral zone, even though littoral habitats are a small fraction of total lake areas.

Because the littoral zone is important for many recreational and industrial purposes, it is often severely affected by human activities that increase nutrient loading, spread invasive species, cause acidification and climate change, and produce increased fluctuations in water level. Littoral zones are both more negatively affected by human activity and less intensively studied than offshore waters. Conservation of the biodiversity and biotic integrity of large lakes will require better integration of littoral zones into the understanding of lake ecosystem functioning and focused efforts to alleviate human impacts along the shoreline.

== See also ==
- Ballantine scale – Marine biology measurement scale
- Benthic zone – Ecological region at the lowest level of a body of water
- Coastal fish – Fish that inhabit the sea between the shoreline and the edge of the continental shelf
- Intertidal Zone – Area of coast exposed only at low tide
- Limnetic zone – Photic zone above the benthic zone in a freestanding body of water
- Littoral combat ship – Ship designed for operations near shore
- Littoral series – Shoreline where the land descends gradually into the sea
- Littoral warfare – Military operations in coastal waters
- Longshore drift – Sediment moved by the longshore current
- Marine debris – Human-created solid waste in the sea or ocean
- Neritic zone – Relatively shallow part of the ocean above the drop-off of the continental shelf
- Pelagic zone – Water column of the open ocean
- Profundal zone
- Riparian zone – Interface between land and a river or stream
- Shingle beach – Beach composed of gravel
