= Profundal zone =

The profundal zone is the deep zone of a lake, located below the range of effective light penetration. This is typically below the thermocline, the vertical zone in the water through which temperature drops rapidly. The temperature difference may be large enough to hamper mixing with the littoral zone in some seasons which causes a decrease in oxygen concentrations. The profundal is often defined, as the deepest, vegetation-free, and muddy zone of the lacustrine benthal. The profundal zone is often part of the aphotic zone. Sediment in the profundal zone primarily comprises silt and mud.

== Organisms ==
The lack of light and oxygen in the profundal zone determines the type of biological community that can live in this region, which is distinctly different from the community in the overlying waters. The profundal macrofauna is therefore characterized by physiological and behavioural adaptations to low oxygen concentration. While benthic fauna differs between lakes, Chironomidae and Oligochaetae often dominate the benthic fauna of the profundal zone because they possess hemoglobin-like molecules to extract oxygen from poorly oxygenated water. Due to the low productivity of the profundal zone, organisms rely on detritus sinking from the photic zone. Species richness in the profundal zone is often similar to that in the limnetic zone. Microbial levels in the profundal benthos are higher than those in the littoral benthos, potentially due to a smaller average sediment particle size. Benthic macroinvertebrates are believed to be regulated by top-down pressure.

== Nutrient cycling ==
Nutrient fluxes in the profundal zone are primarily driven by release from the benthos. The anoxic nature of the profundal zone drives ammonia release from benthic sediment. This can drive phytoplankton production, to the point of a phytoplankton bloom, and create toxic conditions for many organisms, particularly at a high pH. Hypolimnetic anoxia can also contribute to buildups of iron, manganese, and sulfide in the profundal zone.

== See also ==
- Benthic zone
- Littoral zone
- Limnetic zone
- Lake stratification
