= Lake =

Large inland body of relatively still water

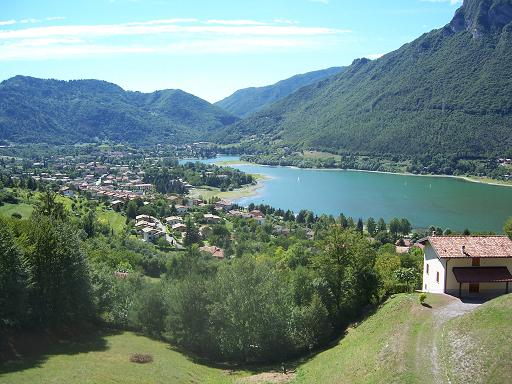
Lake Idro, an Italian prealpine lake of glacial origin situated largely within the province of Brescia (Lombardy) and in part in Trentino.

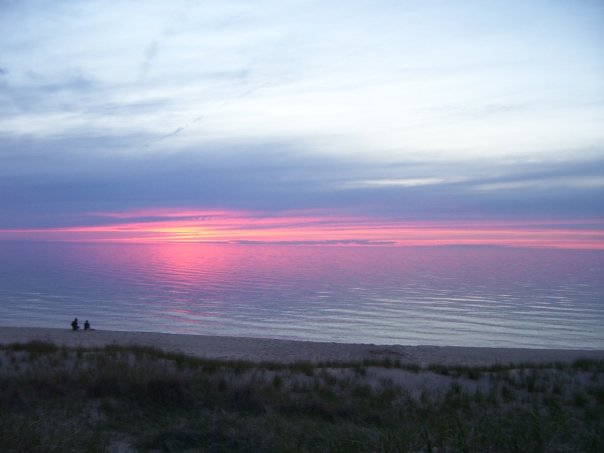
Sunset over Lake Michigan at Nordhouse Dunes in Manistee National Forest, Michigan, United States

A lake is often a naturally occurring, relatively large and fixed body of water on or near the Earth's surface. It is localized in a basin or interconnected basins surrounded by dry land. Lakes lie completely on land and are separate from the ocean, although they may be connected with the ocean by outflowing rivers. Lakes, like other bodies of water, are part of the water cycle, the processes by which water moves around the Earth. Most lakes are fresh water and account for almost all the world's surface freshwater, but some are salt lakes with salinities even higher than that of seawater. Lakes vary significantly in surface area and volume of water, but in total cover approximately 2.5 × 10^{6} km^{2} (less than 2%) of the Earth's surface.

Lakes are typically larger and deeper than ponds, which are also water-filled basins on land, although there are no official definitions or scientific criteria distinguishing the two. Lakes are also distinct from lagoons, which are generally shallow tidal pools dammed by sandbars or other material at coastal regions of oceans or large lakes. Most lakes are fed by springs, precipitation, and surface runoff, and both fed and drained by creeks, and rivers, but some lakes are endorheic without any outflow, while volcanic lakes are filled by precipitation and runoff and do not have any inflow streams.

Natural lakes are generally found in mountainous areas (i.e. alpine lakes), dormant volcanic craters, rift zones and areas with ongoing glaciation. Other lakes are found in depressed landforms or along the courses of mature rivers, where a river channel has widened over a basin formed by eroded floodplains and wetlands. Some lakes are found in caverns underground. Some parts of the world have many lakes formed by the chaotic drainage patterns left over from the last ice age. On a geologic time scale, all lakes have a finite lifetime, as they will eventually fill in with sediments or spill out of the basin containing them.

Artificially controlled lakes are known as reservoirs, and are usually constructed for industrial, agricultural or aquacultural use, for hydroelectric power generation, for supplying domestic drinking water, for ecological or recreational purposes, or for other human activities.

== Etymology, meaning, and usage of "lake" ==
The word lake comes from Middle English lake ('lake, pond, waterway'), from Old English lacu ('pond, pool, stream'), from Proto-Germanic *lakō ('pond, ditch, slow moving stream'), from the Proto-Indo-European root *leǵ- ('to leak, drain'). Cognates include Dutch laak ('lake, pond, ditch'), Middle Low German lāke ('water pooled in a riverbed, puddle') as in: de:Wolfslake, de:Butterlake, Modern Low German Laak ('pool, puddle'), German Lache ('pool, puddle'), and Icelandic lækur ('slow flowing stream'). Also related are the English words leak and leach.

There is considerable uncertainty about defining the difference between lakes and ponds, and neither term has an internationally accepted definition across scientific disciplines or political boundaries. For example, limnologists have defined lakes as water bodies that are simply a larger version of a pond, which can have wave action on the shoreline or where wind-induced turbulence plays a major role in mixing the water column. None of these definitions completely excludes ponds and all are difficult to measure. For this reason, simple size-based definitions are increasingly used to separate ponds and lakes. Definitions for lake range in minimum sizes for a body of water from 2 hectares (5 acres) to 8 hectares (20 acres). Pioneering animal ecologist Charles Elton regarded lakes as waterbodies of 40 hectares (99 acres) or more. The term lake is also used to describe a feature such as Lake Eyre, which is a dry basin most of the time but may become filled under seasonal conditions of heavy rainfall. In common usage, many lakes bear names ending with the word pond, and a lesser number of names ending with lake are, in quasi-technical fact, ponds. One textbook illustrates this point with the following: "In Newfoundland, for example, almost every lake is called a pond, whereas in Wisconsin, almost every pond is called a lake."

One hydrology book proposes to define the term "lake" as a body of water with the following five characteristics:

1. It partially or totally fills one or several basins connected by straits;
2. It has essentially the same water level in all parts (except for relatively short-lived variations caused by wind, varying ice cover, large inflows, etc.);
3. It does not have regular intrusion of seawater;
4. A considerable portion of the sediment suspended in the water is captured by the basins (for this to happen they need to have a sufficiently small inflow-to-volume ratio);
5. The area measured at the mean water level exceeds an arbitrarily chosen threshold (for instance, one hectare).

With the exception of criterion 3, the others have been accepted or elaborated upon by other hydrology publications.

== Distribution ==
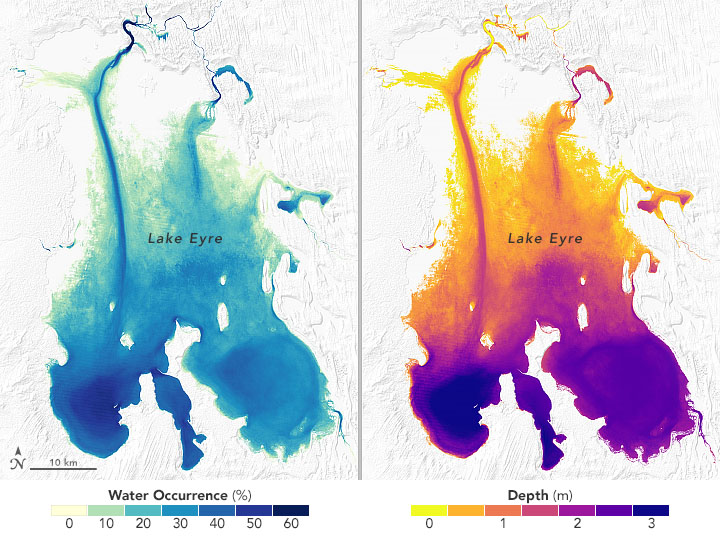
Lake Eyre's shape and depth as a gradient map

The majority of lakes on Earth are freshwater, and most lie in the Northern Hemisphere at higher latitudes. Canada, with a deranged drainage system, has an estimated 31,752 lakes larger than 3 square kilometres (1.2 sq mi) in surface area. The total number of lakes in Canada is unknown but is estimated to be at least 2 million. Finland has 168,000 lakes of 500 square metres (5,400 sq ft) in area, or larger, of which 57,000 are large (10,000 square metres (110,000 sq ft) or larger).

Most lakes have at least one natural outflow in the form of a river or stream, which maintains a lake's average level by draining excess water. Some lakes do not have a natural outflow and lose water solely by evaporation or underground seepage, or both. These are termed endorheic lakes.

Many lakes are artificial and are constructed for hydroelectric power generation, aesthetic purposes, recreational purposes, industrial use, agricultural use, or domestic water supply.

The number of lakes on Earth is undetermined because most lakes and ponds are very small and do not appear on maps or satellite imagery. Despite this uncertainty, a large number of studies agree that small ponds are much more abundant than large lakes. For example, one widely cited study estimated that Earth has 304 million lakes and ponds, and that 91% of these are 1 hectare (2.5 acres) or less in area. Despite the overwhelming abundance of ponds, almost all of Earth's lake water is found in fewer than 100 large lakes; this is partly because lake volume scales superlinearly with lake area, i.e. large lakes tend to be deeper than small lakes.

Extraterrestrial lakes exist on the moon Titan, which orbits the planet Saturn. The shape of lakes on Titan is very similar to those on Earth. Lakes were formerly present on the surface of Mars, but are now dry lake beds.

== Types ==
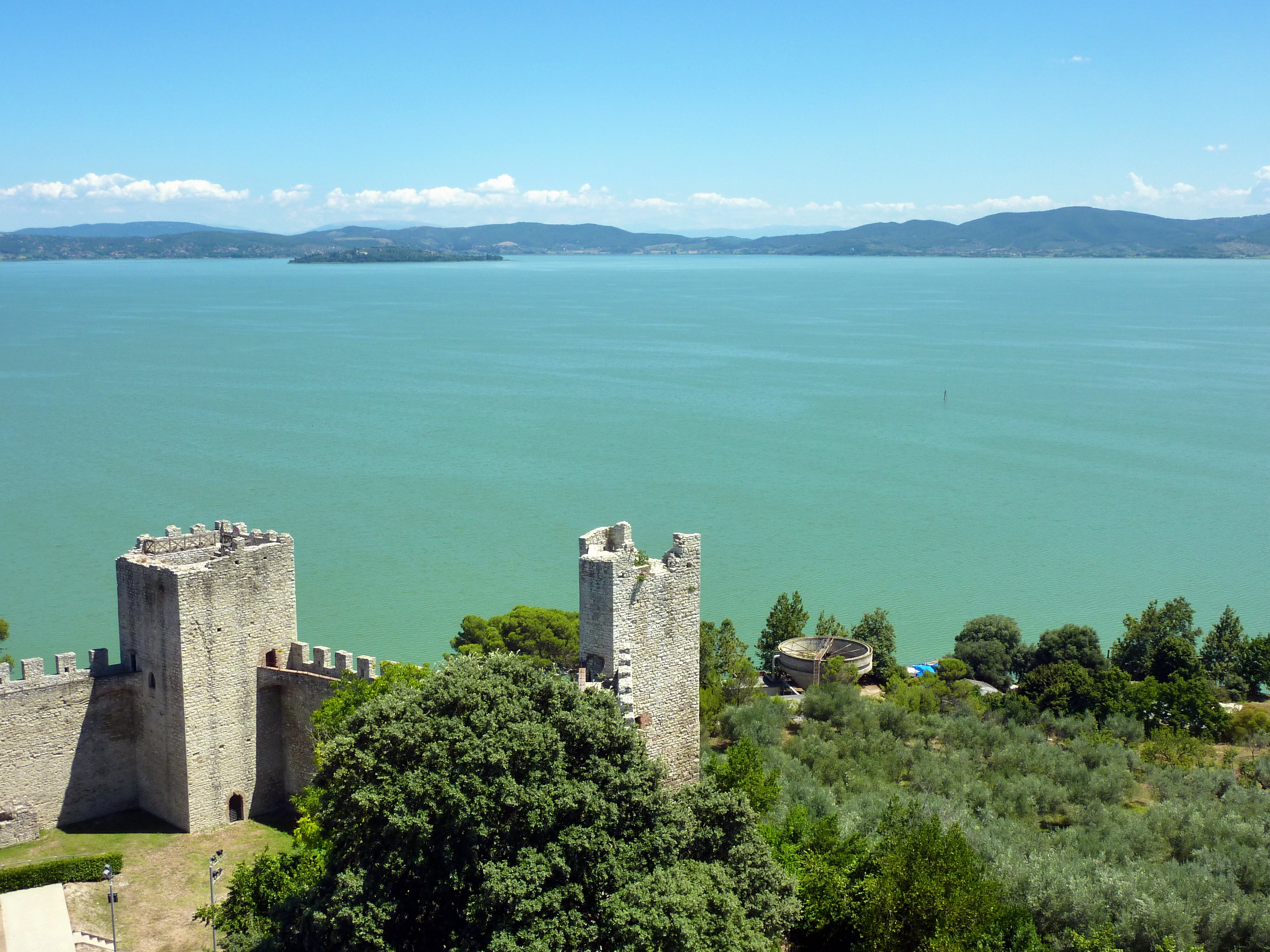
Lake Trasimeno, Italy, has volcanic origin

In 1957, G. Evelyn Hutchinson published a monograph titled A Treatise on Limnology, which is regarded as a landmark discussion and classification of all major lake types, their origin, morphometric characteristics, and distribution. Hutchinson presented in his publication a comprehensive analysis of the origin of lakes and proposed what is a widely accepted classification of lakes according to their origin. This classification recognizes 11 major lake types that are divided into 76 subtypes. The 11 major lake types are:

- tectonic lakes
- volcanic lakes
- glacial lakes
- fluvial lakes
- solution lakes
- landslide lakes
- aeolian lakes
- shoreline lakes
- organic lakes
- anthropogenic lakes
- meteorite (extraterrestrial impact) lakes

=== Tectonic lakes ===
Tectonic lakes are lakes formed by the deformation and resulting lateral and vertical movements of the Earth's crust. These movements include faulting, tilting, folding, and warping. Some of the largest lakes on Earth are rift lakes occupying rift valleys, e.g. Central African Rift lakes and Lake Baikal. Other well-known tectonic lakes, Caspian Sea, the Sea of Aral, and other lakes from the Pontocaspian occupy basins that have been separated from the sea by the tectonic uplift of the sea floor above the ocean level.

Often, the tectonic action of crustal extension has created an alternating series of parallel grabens and horsts that form elongate basins alternating with mountain ranges. Not only does this promote the creation of lakes by the disruption of preexisting drainage networks, it also creates within arid regions endorheic basins that contain salt lakes (also called saline lakes). They form where there is no natural outlet, a high evaporation rate and the drainage surface of the water table has a higher-than-normal salt content. Examples of these salt lakes include Great Salt Lake and the Dead Sea. Another type of tectonic lake caused by faulting is sag ponds.

=== Volcanic lakes ===
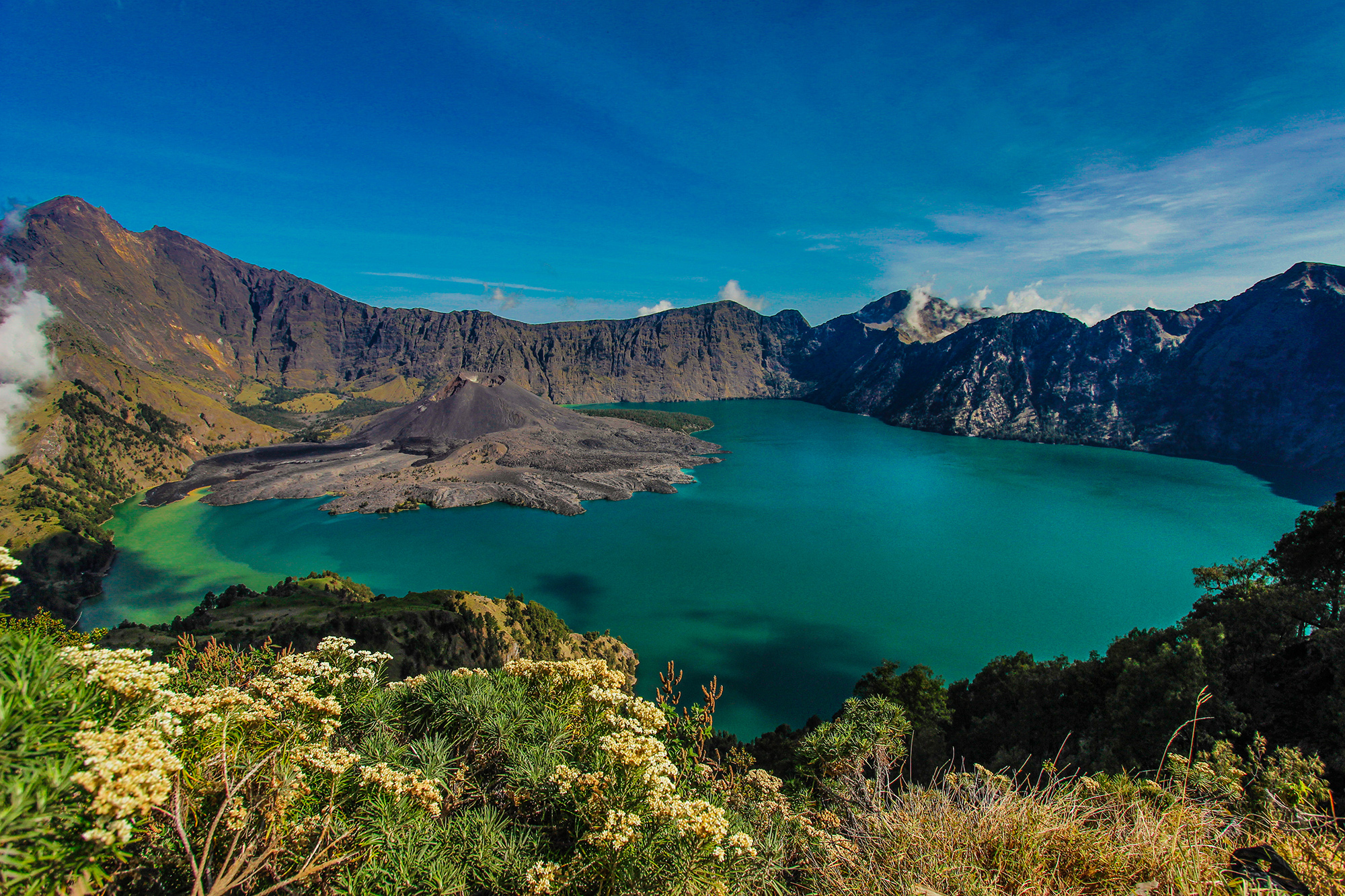
The crater lake of Mount Rinjani, Indonesia

Volcanic lakes are lakes that occupy either local depressions, e.g. craters and maars, or larger basins, e.g. calderas, created by volcanism. Crater lakes are formed in volcanic craters and calderas, which fill up with precipitation more rapidly than they empty via either evaporation, groundwater discharge, or a combination of both. Sometimes the latter are called caldera lakes, although often no distinction is made. An example is Crater Lake in Oregon, in the caldera of Mount Mazama. The caldera was created in a massive volcanic eruption that led to the subsidence of Mount Mazama around 4860 BC. Other volcanic lakes are created when either rivers or streams are dammed by lava flows or volcanic lahars. The basin which is now Malheur Lake, Oregon was created when a lava flow dammed the Malheur River. Among all lake types, volcanic crater lakes most closely approximate a circular shape.

=== Glacial lakes ===
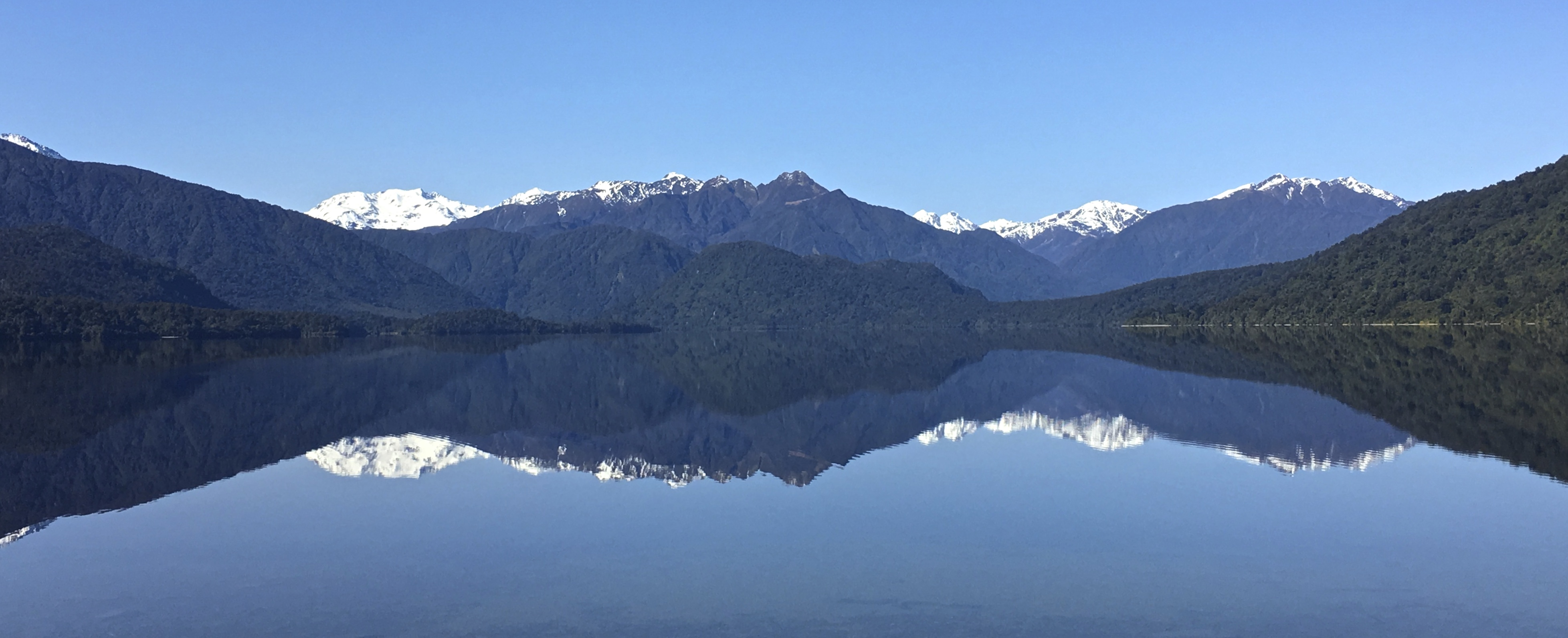
Lake Kaniere is a glacial lake in the West Coast region of New Zealand.

Glacial lakes are lakes created by the direct action of glaciers and continental ice sheets. A wide variety of glacial processes create enclosed basins. As a result, there are a wide variety of different types of glacial lakes and it is often difficult to define clear-cut distinctions between different types of glacial lakes and lakes influenced by other activities. The general types of glacial lakes that have been recognized are lakes in direct contact with ice, glacially carved rock basins and depressions, morainic and outwash lakes, and glacial drift basins. Glacial lakes are the most numerous lakes in the world. Most lakes in northern Europe and North America have been either influenced or created by the latest, but not last, glaciation, to have covered the region. Glacial lakes include proglacial lakes, subglacial lakes, finger lakes, and epishelf lakes. Epishelf lakes are highly stratified lakes in which a layer of freshwater, derived from ice and snow melt, is dammed behind an ice shelf that is attached to the coastline. They are mostly found in Antarctica.

=== Fluvial lakes ===
Fluvial (or riverine) lakes are lakes produced by running water. These lakes include plunge pool lakes, fluviatile dams and meander lakes.

==== Oxbow lakes ====
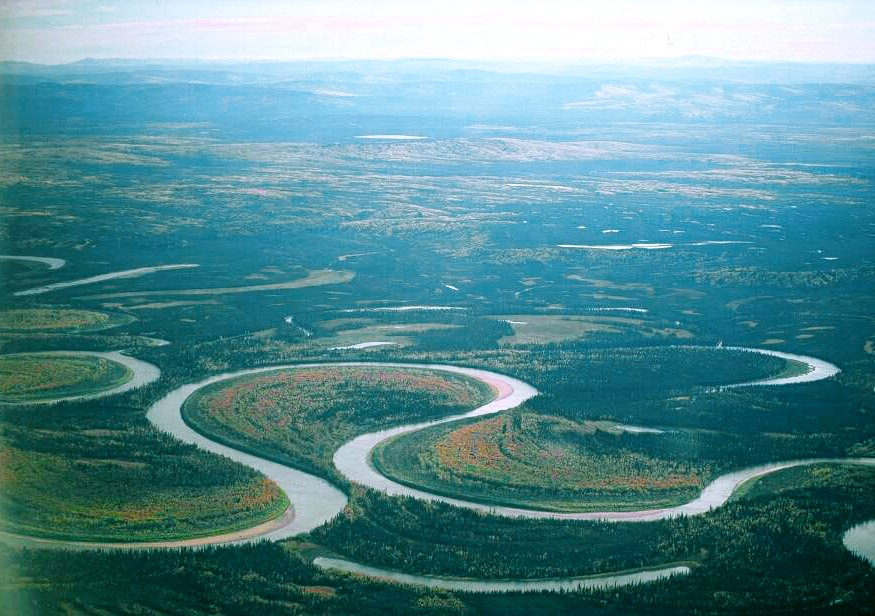
The Nowitna River in Alaska. Two oxbow lakes – a short one at the bottom of the picture and a longer, more curved one at the middle-right.

The most common type of fluvial lake is a crescent-shaped lake called an oxbow lake due to the distinctive curved shape. They can form in river valleys as a result of meandering. The slow-moving river forms a sinuous shape as the outer side of bends are eroded away more rapidly than the inner side. Eventually a horseshoe bend is formed and the river cuts through the narrow neck. This new passage then forms the main passage for the river and the ends of the bend become silted up, thus forming a bow-shaped lake. Their crescent shape gives oxbow lakes a higher perimeter to area ratio than other lake types.

==== Fluviatile dams ====
These form where sediment from a tributary blocks the main river.

==== Lateral lakes ====
These form where sediment from the main river blocks a tributary, usually in the form of a levee.

==== Floodplain lakes ====
Lakes formed by other processes responsible for floodplain basin creation. During high floods they are flushed with river water. There are four types: 1. Confluent floodplain lake, 2. Contrafluent-confluent floodplain lake, 3. Contrafluent floodplain lake, 4. Profundal floodplain lake.

=== Solution lakes ===
A solution lake is a lake occupying a basin formed by surface dissolution of bedrock. In areas underlain by soluble bedrock, its solution by precipitation and percolating water commonly produce cavities. These cavities frequently collapse to form sinkholes that form part of the local karst topography. Where groundwater lies near the grounds surface, a sinkhole will be filled water as a solution lake. If such a lake consists of a large area of standing water that occupies an extensive closed depression in limestone, it is also called a karst lake. Smaller solution lakes that consist of a body of standing water in a closed depression within a karst region are known as karst ponds. Limestone caves often contain pools of standing water, which are known as underground lakes. Classic examples of solution lakes are abundant in the karst regions at the Dalmatian coast of Croatia and within large parts of Florida.

=== Landslide lakes ===
A landslide lake is created by the blockage of a river valley by either mudflows, rockslides, or screes. Such lakes are most common in mountainous regions. Although landslide lakes may be large and quite deep, they are typically short-lived. An example of a landslide lake is Quake Lake, which formed as a result of the 1959 Hebgen Lake earthquake.

Most landslide lakes disappear in the first few months after formation, but a landslide dam can burst suddenly at a later stage and threaten the population downstream when the lake water drains out. In 1911, an earthquake triggered a landslide that blocked a deep valley in the Pamir Mountains region of Tajikistan, forming the Sarez Lake. The Usoi Dam at the base of the valley has remained in place for more than 100 years but the terrain below the lake is in danger of a catastrophic flood if the dam were to fail during a future earthquake.

Tal-y-llyn Lake in north Wales is a landslide lake dating back to the last glaciation in Wales some 20,000 years ago.

=== Aeolian lakes ===
Aeolian lakes are produced by wind action. These lakes are found mainly in arid environments, although some aeolian lakes are relict landforms indicative of arid paleoclimates. Aeolian lakes consist of lake basins dammed by wind-blown sand; interdunal lakes that lie between well-oriented sand dunes; and deflation basins formed by wind action under previously arid paleoenvironments. Moses Lake in Washington, United States, was originally a shallow natural lake and an example of a lake basin dammed by wind-blown sand.

China's Badain Jaran Desert is a unique landscape of megadunes and elongated interdunal aeolian lakes, particularly concentrated in the southeastern margin of the desert.

=== Shoreline lakes ===
Shoreline lakes are generally lakes created by blockage of estuaries or by the uneven accretion of beach ridges by longshore and other currents. They include maritime coastal lakes, ordinarily in drowned estuaries; lakes enclosed by two tombolos or spits connecting an island to the mainland; lakes cut off from larger lakes by a bar; or lakes divided by the meeting of two spits.

=== Organic lakes ===
Organic lakes are lakes created by the actions of plants and animals. On the whole they are relatively rare in occurrence and quite small in size. In addition, they typically have ephemeral features relative to the other types of lakes. The basins in which organic lakes occur are associated with beaver dams, coral lakes, or dams formed by vegetation.

==== Peat lakes ====
Peat lakes are a form of organic lake. They form where a buildup of partly decomposed plant material in a wet environment leaves the vegetated surface below the water table for a sustained period of time. They are often low in nutrients and mildly acidic, with bottom waters low in dissolved oxygen.

=== Artificial lakes ===
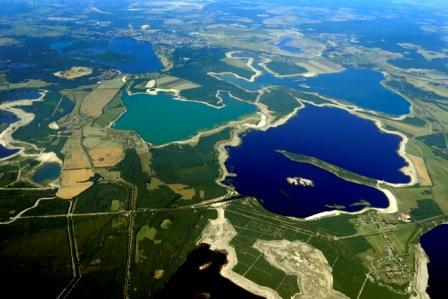
Lusatian Lake District, Germany, Europe's largest artificial lake district.

Artificial lakes or anthropogenic lakes are large waterbodies created by human activity. They can be formed by the intentional damming of rivers and streams, rerouting of water to inundate a previously dry basin, or the deliberate filling of abandoned excavation pits by either precipitation runoff, ground water, or a combination of both. Artificial lakes may be used as storage reservoirs that provide drinking water for nearby settlements, to generate hydroelectricity, for flood management, for supplying agriculture or aquaculture, or to provide an aquatic sanctuary for parks and nature reserves.

The Upper Silesian region of southern Poland contains an anthropogenic lake district consisting of more than 4,000 water bodies created by human activity. The diverse origins of these lakes include: reservoirs retained by dams, flooded mines, water bodies formed in subsidence basins and hollows, levee ponds, and residual water bodies following river regulation. Same for the Lusatian Lake District, Germany. In India, Sudarshana Lake is a historical artificial lake located in the semi-arid region of Girnar, Gujarat, originally constructed during the reign of Chandragupta Maurya.

=== Meteorite (extraterrestrial impact) lakes ===
Meteorite lakes, also known as crater lakes (not to be confused with volcanic crater lakes), are created by catastrophic impacts with the Earth by extraterrestrial objects (either meteorites or asteroids). Examples of meteorite lakes are Lonar Lake in India, Lake El'gygytgyn in northeast Siberia, and the Pingualuit crater lake in Quebec, Canada. As in the cases of El'gygytgyn and Pingualuit, meteorite lakes can contain unique and scientifically valuable sedimentary deposits associated with long records of paleoclimatic changes.

== Other classification methods ==
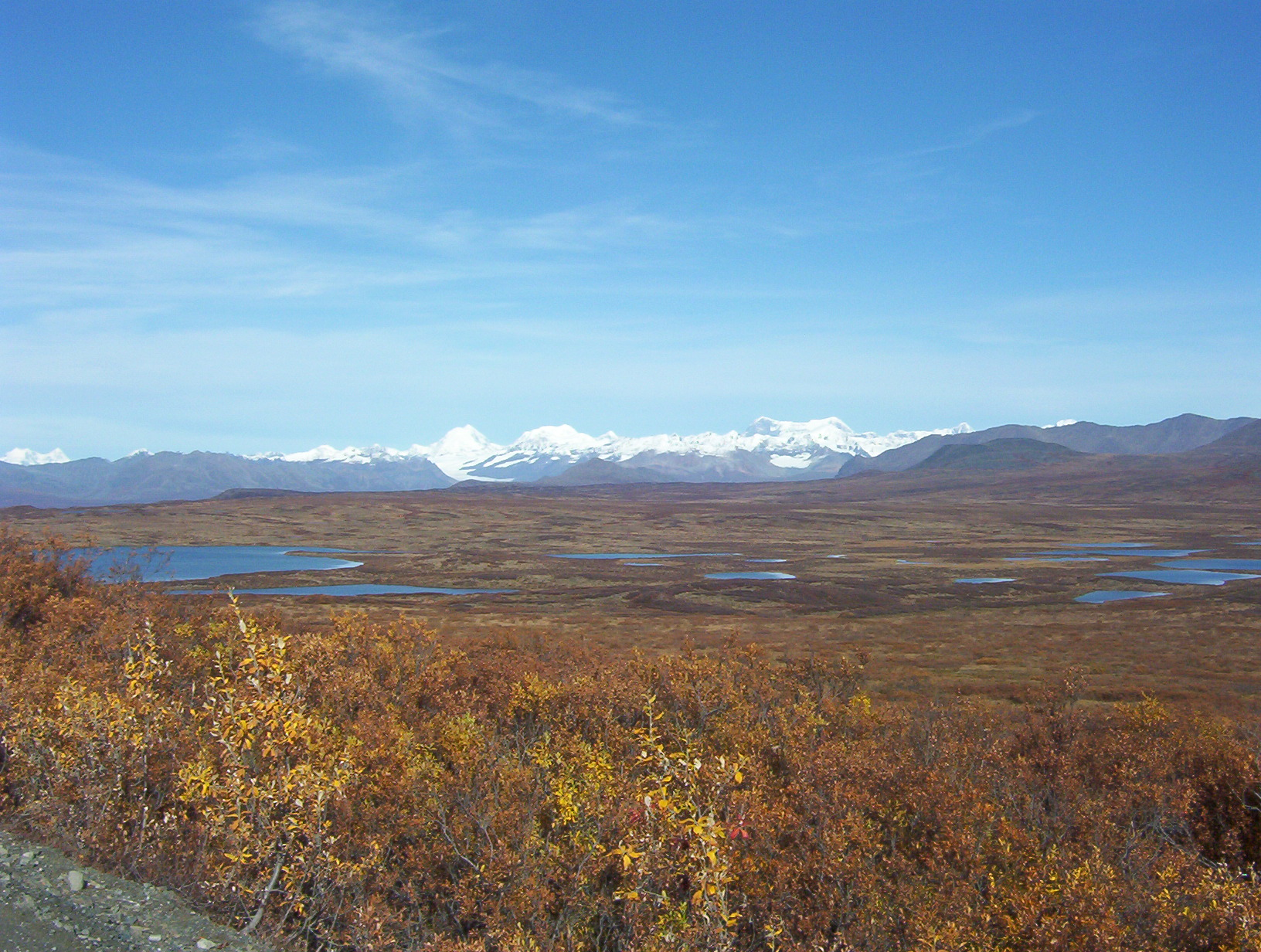
These kettle lakes in Alaska were formed by a retreating glacier.

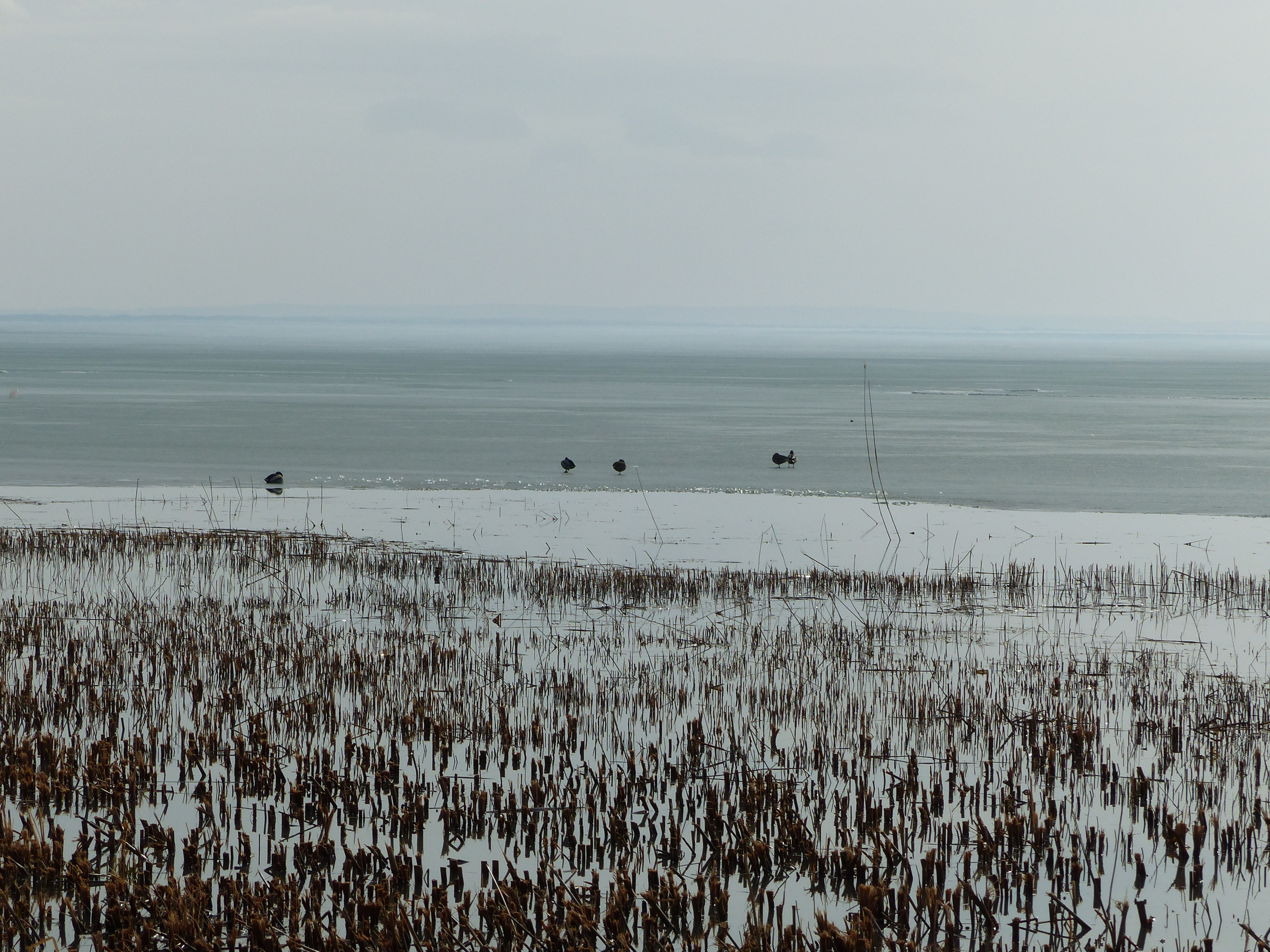
Ice melting on Lake Balaton in Hungary

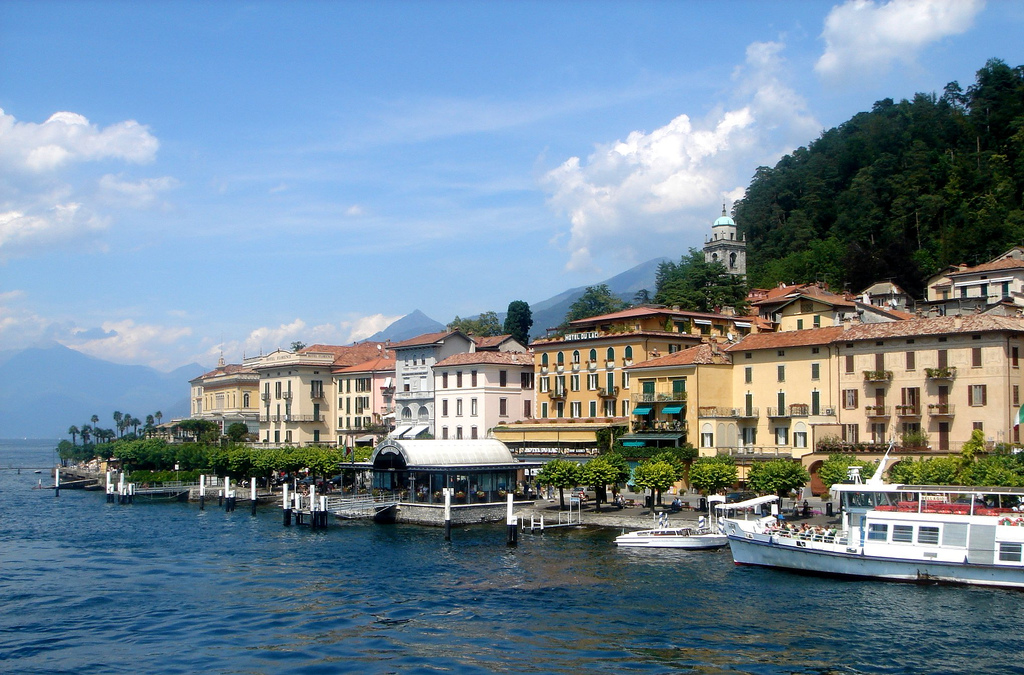
Bellagio, on the shores of Lake Como, Italy

In addition to the mode of origin, lakes have been named and classified according to various other important factors such as thermal stratification, oxygen saturation, seasonal variations in lake volume and water level, salinity of the water mass, relative seasonal permanence, degree of outflow, and so on. The names used by the lay public and in the scientific community for different types of lakes are often informally derived from the morphology of the lakes' physical characteristics or other factors. Also, different cultures and regions of the world have their own popular nomenclature.

=== By thermal stratification ===
One important method of lake classification is on the basis of thermal stratification, which has a major influence on the animal and plant life inhabiting a lake, and the fate and distribution of dissolved and suspended material in the lake. For example, the thermal stratification, as well as the degree and frequency of mixing, has a strong control over the distribution of oxygen within the lake.

Professor F.-A. Forel, also referred to as the "Father of limnology", was the first scientist to classify lakes according to their thermal stratification. His system of classification was later modified and improved upon by Hutchinson and Löffler. As the density of water varies with temperature, with a maximum at +4 degrees Celsius, thermal stratification is an important physical characteristic of a lake that controls the fauna and flora, sedimentation, chemistry, and other aspects of individual lakes. First, the colder, denser water typically forms a layer near the bottom, which is called the hypolimnion. Second, normally overlying the hypolimnion is a transition zone known as the metalimnion. Finally, overlying the metalimnion is a surface layer of warmer water with a lower density, called the epilimnion. This typical stratification sequence can vary widely, depending on the specific lake or the time of year, or a combination of both. The classification of lakes by thermal stratification presupposes lakes with sufficient depth to form a hypolimnion; accordingly, very shallow lakes are excluded from this classification system.

Based upon their thermal stratification, lakes are classified as either holomictic, with a uniform temperature and density from top to bottom at a given time of year, or meromictic, with layers of water of different temperature and density that do not intermix. The deepest layer of water in a meromictic lake does not contain any dissolved oxygen so there are no living aerobic organisms. Consequently, the layers of sediment at the bottom of a meromictic lake remain relatively undisturbed, which allows for the development of lacustrine deposits. In a holomictic lake, the uniformity of temperature and density allows the lake waters to completely mix. Based upon thermal stratification and frequency of turnover, holomictic lakes are divided into amictic lakes, cold monomictic lakes, dimictic lakes, warm monomictic lakes, polymictic lakes, and oligomictic lakes.

Lake stratification does not always result from a variation in density because of thermal gradients. Stratification can also result from a density variation caused by gradients in salinity. In this case, the hypolimnion and epilimnion are separated not by a thermocline but by a halocline, which is sometimes referred to as a chemocline.

=== By seasonal variations in water level and volume ===
Lakes are informally classified and named according to the seasonal variation in their lake level and volume. Some of the names include:

- Ephemeral lake is a short-lived lake or pond. If it fills with water and dries up (disappears) seasonally it is known as an intermittent lake They often fill poljes.
- Dry lake is a popular name for an ephemeral lake that contains water only intermediately at irregular and infrequent intervals.
- Perennial lake is a lake that has water in its basin throughout the year and is not subject to extreme fluctuations in level.
- Playa lake is a typically shallow, intermittent lake that covers or occupies a playa either in wet seasons or in especially wet years but subsequently drying up in an arid or semiarid region.
- Vlei is a name used in South Africa for a shallow lake which varies considerably in level with the seasons.

=== By water chemistry ===
Lakes may be informally classified and named according to the general chemistry of their water mass. Using this classification method, the lake types include:

- An acid lake contains water with a below-neutral pH of less than 6.5. A lake is considered to be highly acidic if its pH drops below 5.5, leading to biological consequences. Such lakes include: acidic pit lakes occupying abandoned mines and excavations; naturally acidic lakes of igneous and metamorphic landscapes; peat bogs in northern regions; crater lakes of active and dormant volcanoes; and lakes acidified by acid rain.
- A salt lake, also known as a saline lake or brine lake, is an inland body of water situated in an arid or semiarid region, with no outlet to the sea, containing a high concentration of dissolved neutral salts (principally sodium chloride). Examples include the Great Salt Lake in Utah, and the Dead Sea in southwestern Asia.
- An alkali sink, also known as an alkali flat or salt flat, is a shallow saline feature that can be found in low-lying areas of arid regions and in groundwater discharge zones. These features are typically classified as dry lakes, or playas, because they are periodically flooded by rain or flood events and then dry up during drier intervals, leaving accumulations of brines and evaporitic minerals.
- A salt pan is a small shallow natural depression in which water accumulates and evaporates, leaving a salt deposit, or the shallow lake of brackish water that occupies a salt pan. (The term "salt pan" comes from open-pan salt making, a method of extracting salt from brine using large open pans.)
- A saline pan is another name for an ephemeral acid saline lake which precipitates a bottom crust that is subsequently modified during subaerial exposure.

=== Composed of other liquids ===
- Lava lake is a large volume of molten lava, usually basaltic, contained in a volcanic vent, crater, or broad depression.
- Hydrocarbon lakes are bodies of liquid ethane and methane that occupy depressions on the surface of Titan. They were detected by the Cassini–Huygens space probe.

== Paleolakes ==
A paleolake (also palaeolake) is a lake that existed in the past when hydrological conditions were different. Quaternary paleolakes can often be identified on the basis of relict lacustrine landforms, such as relict lake plains and coastal landforms that form recognizable relict shorelines called paleoshorelines. Paleolakes can also be recognized by characteristic sedimentary deposits that accumulated in them and any fossils that might be contained in these sediments. The paleoshorelines and sedimentary deposits of paleolakes provide evidence for prehistoric hydrological changes during the times that they existed.

There are two types of paleolake:

- A former lake is a paleolake that no longer exists. Such lakes include prehistoric lakes and those that have permanently dried up, often as the result of either evaporation or human intervention. An example of a former lake is Owens Lake in California, United States. Former lakes are a common feature of the Basin and Range area of southwestern North America.
- A shrunken lake is a paleolake that still exists but has considerably decreased in size over geological time. An example of a shrunken lake is Lake Agassiz, which once covered much of central North America. Two notable remnants of Lake Agassiz are Lake Winnipeg and Lake Winnipegosis.

Paleolakes are of scientific and economic importance. For example, Quaternary paleolakes in semidesert basins are important for two reasons: they played an extremely significant, if transient, role in shaping the floors and piedmonts of many basins; and their sediments contain enormous quantities of geologic and paleontologic information concerning past environments. In addition, the organic-rich deposits of pre-Quaternary paleolakes are important either for the thick deposits of oil shale and shale gas contained in them, or as source rocks of petroleum and natural gas. Although of significantly less economic importance, strata deposited along the shore of paleolakes sometimes contain coal seams.

== Characteristics ==
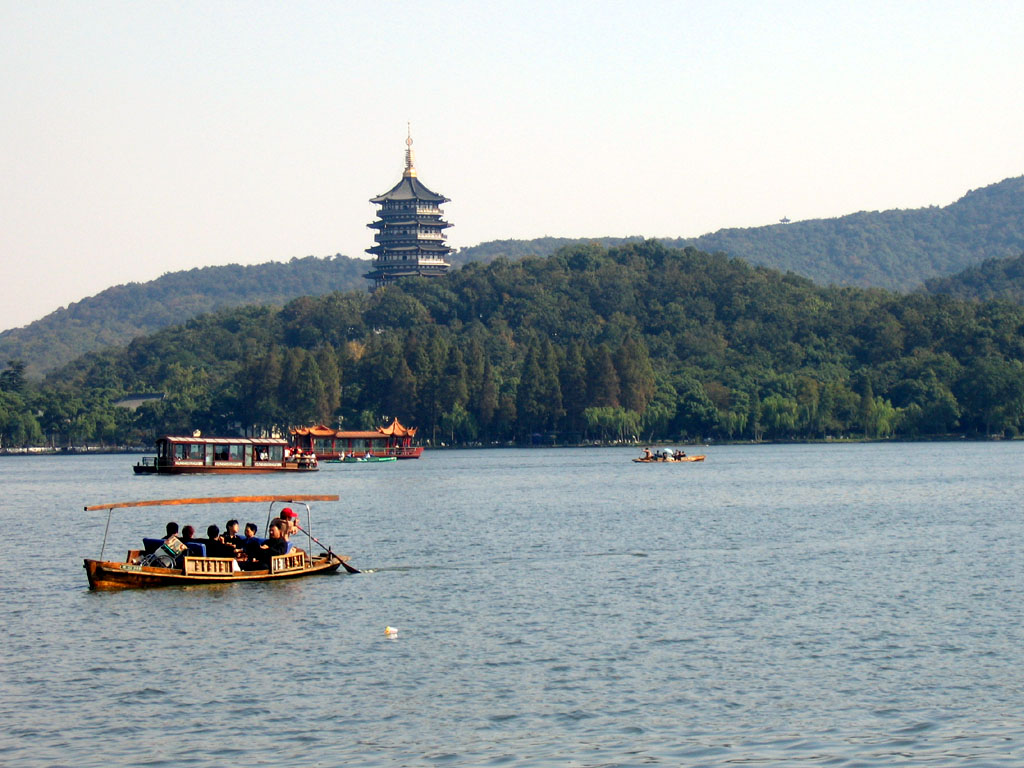
Lakes can have significant cultural importance. The West Lake of Hangzhou has inspired romantic poets throughout the ages, and has been an important influence on garden designs in China, Japan and Korea.

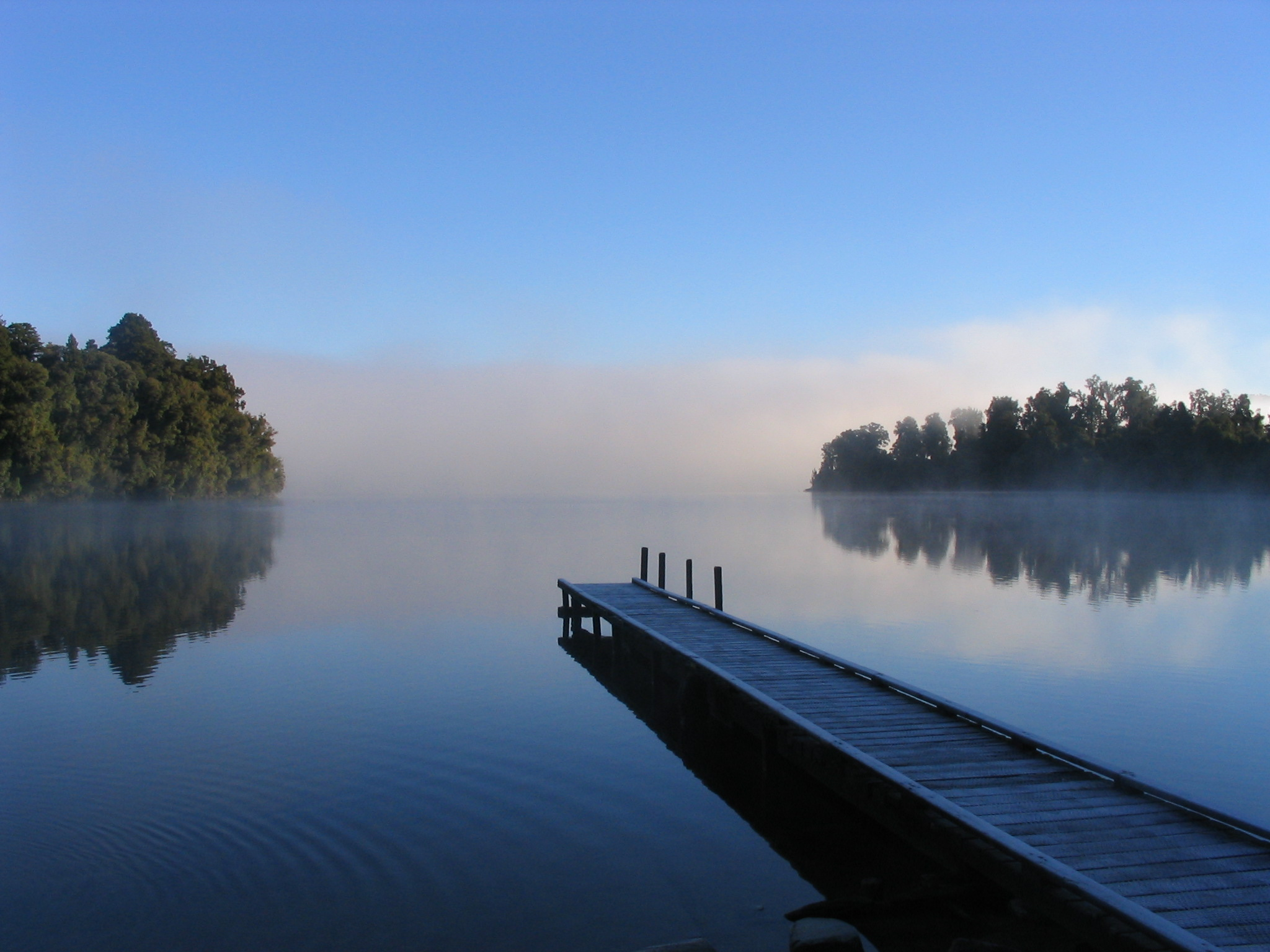
Lake Mapourika, New Zealand

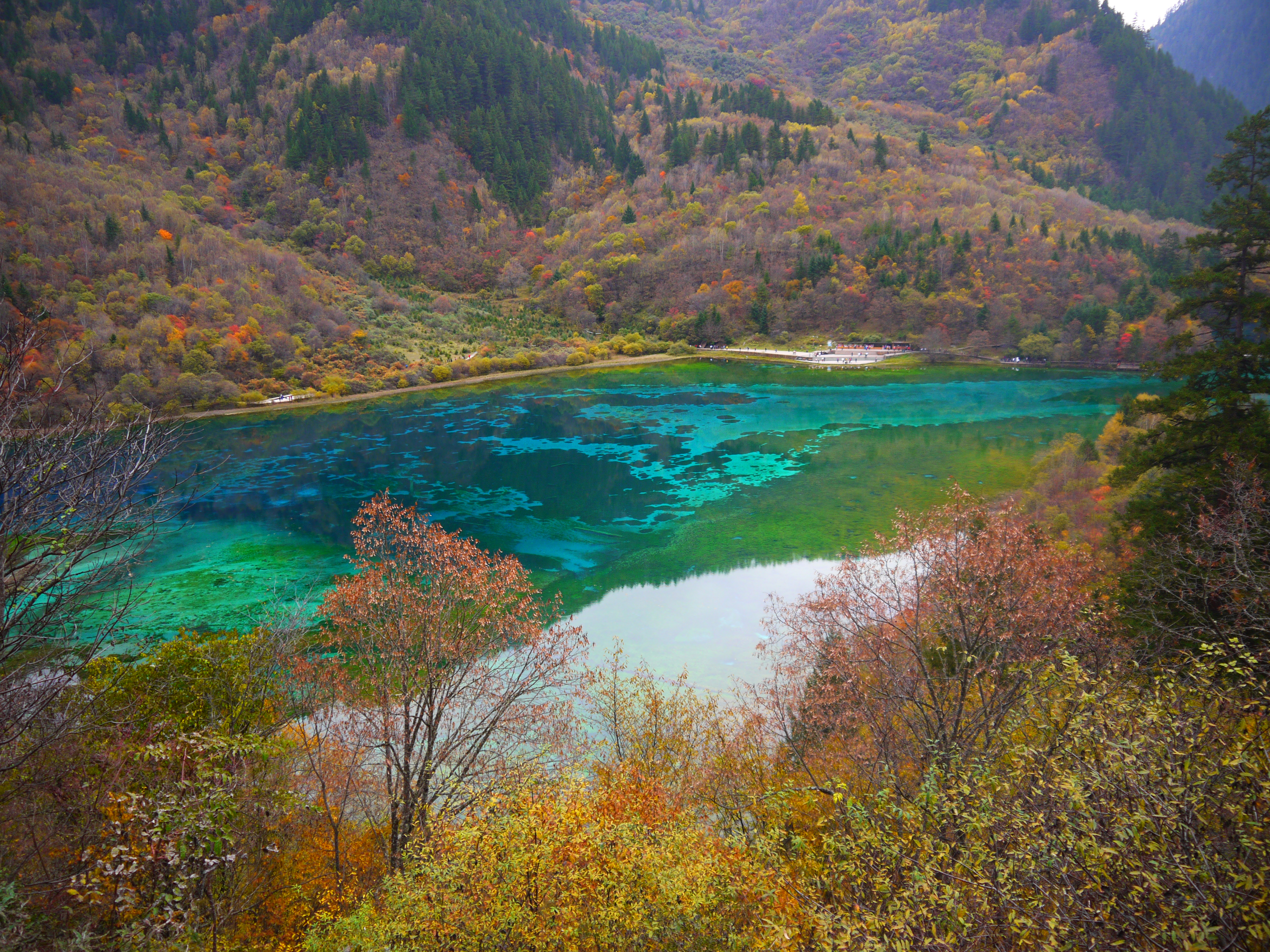
Five Flower Lake in Jiuzhaigou, Sichuan

Lakes have numerous features in addition to lake type, such as drainage basin (also known as catchment area), inflow and outflow, nutrient content, dissolved oxygen, pollutants, pH, and sedimentation.

Changes in the level of a lake are controlled by the difference between the input and output compared to the total volume of the lake. Significant input sources are precipitation onto the lake, runoff carried by streams and channels from the lake's catchment area, groundwater channels and aquifers, and artificial sources from outside the catchment area. Output sources are evaporation from the lake, surface and groundwater flows, and any extraction of lake water by humans. As climate conditions and human water requirements vary, these will create fluctuations in the lake level.

Lakes can be also categorized on the basis of their richness in nutrients, which typically affect plant growth. Nutrient-poor lakes are said to be oligotrophic and are generally clear, having a low concentration of plant life. Mesotrophic lakes have good clarity and an average level of nutrients. Eutrophic lakes are enriched with nutrients, resulting in good plant growth and possible algal blooms. Hypertrophic lakes are bodies of water that have been excessively enriched with nutrients. These lakes typically have poor clarity and are subject to devastating algal blooms. Lakes typically reach this condition due to human activities, such as heavy use of fertilizers in the lake catchment area. Such lakes are of little use to humans and have a poor ecosystem due to decreased dissolved oxygen.

Due to the unusual relationship between water's temperature and its density, lakes form layers called thermoclines, layers of drastically varying temperature relative to depth. Fresh water is most dense at about 4 degrees Celsius (39.2 °F) at sea level. When the temperature of the water at the surface of a lake reaches the same temperature as deeper water, as it does during the cooler months in temperate climates, the water in the lake can mix, bringing oxygen-starved water up from the depths and bringing oxygen down to decomposing sediments. Deep temperate lakes can maintain a reservoir of cold water year-round, which allows some cities to tap that reservoir for deep lake water cooling.

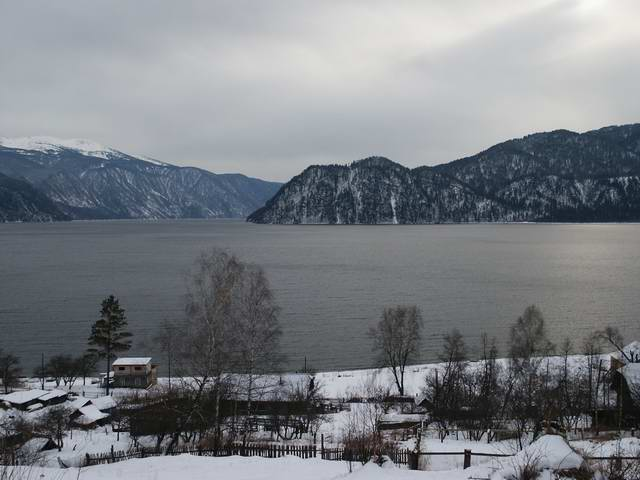
Lake Teletskoye, Siberia

Since the surface water of deep tropical lakes never reaches the temperature of maximum density, there is no process that makes the water mix. The deeper layer becomes oxygen starved and can become saturated with carbon dioxide, or other gases such as sulfur dioxide if there is even a trace of volcanic activity. Exceptional events, such as earthquakes or landslides, can cause mixing which rapidly brings the deep layers up to the surface and release a vast cloud of gas which lay trapped in solution in the colder water at the bottom of the lake. This is called a limnic eruption. An example is the disaster at Lake Nyos in Cameroon. The amount of gas that can be dissolved in water is directly related to pressure. As deep water surfaces, the pressure drops and a vast amount of gas comes out of solution. Under these circumstances carbon dioxide is hazardous because it is heavier than air and displaces it, so it may flow down a river valley to human settlements and cause mass asphyxiation.

The material at the bottom of a lake, or lake bed, may be composed of a wide variety of inorganics, such as silt or sand, and organic material, such as decaying plant or animal matter. The composition of the lake bed has a significant impact on the flora and fauna found within the lake's environs by contributing to the amounts and the types of nutrients available.

A paired (black and white) layer of the varved lake sediments correspond to a year. During winter, when organisms die, carbon is deposited down, resulting to a black layer. At the same year, during summer, only few organic materials are deposited, resulting to a white layer at the lake bed. These are commonly used to track past paleontological events.

Natural lakes provide a microcosm of living and nonliving elements that are relatively independent of their surrounding environments. Therefore, lake organisms can often be studied in isolation from the lake's surroundings.

== Limnology ==
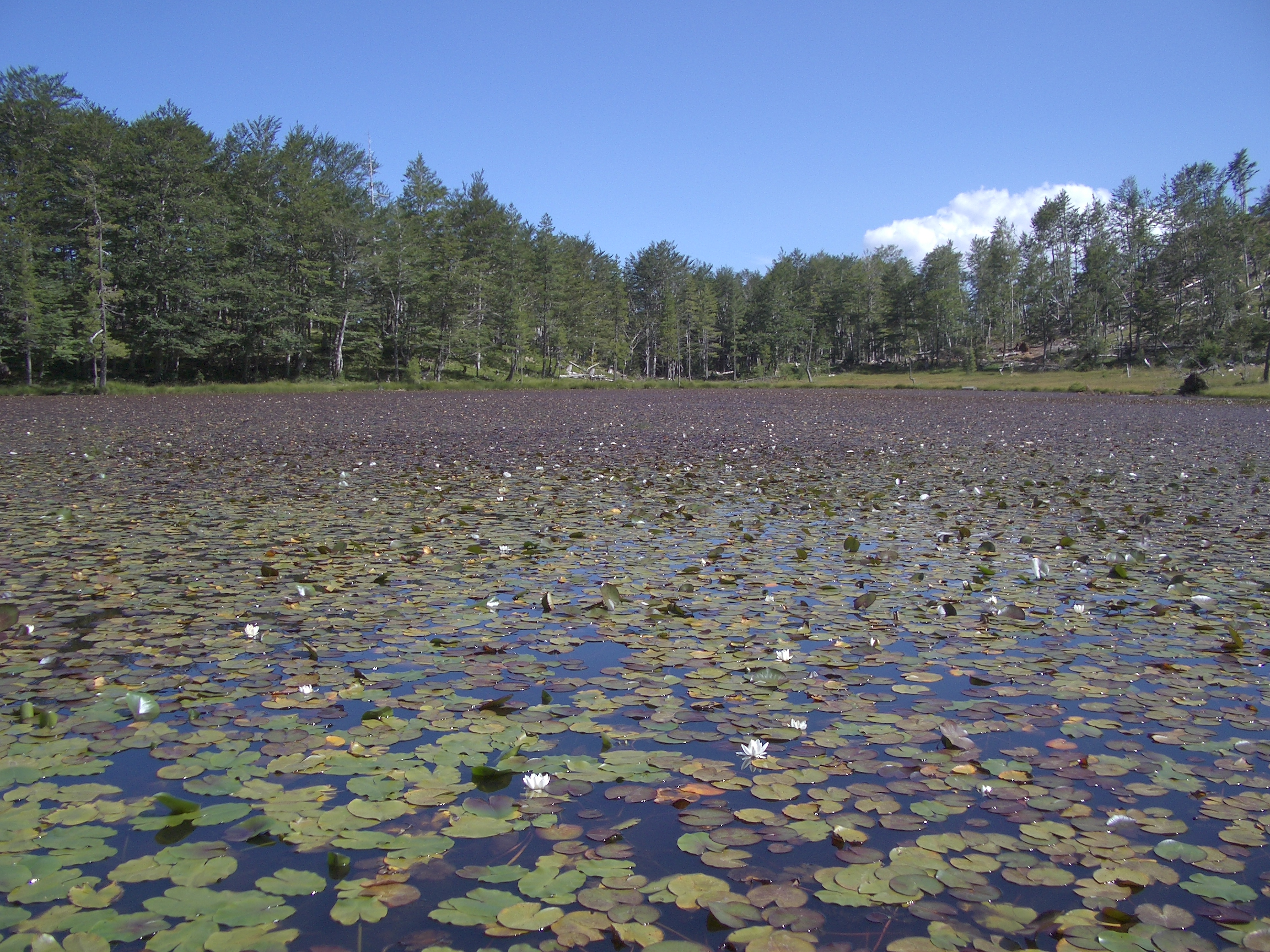
Lura Lakes are the glacial lakes of the Lurë Mountains, Albania

Limnology is the study of inland bodies of water and related ecosystems. Limnology divides lakes into three zones: the littoral zone, a sloped area close to land; the photic or open-water zone, where sunlight is abundant; and the deep-water profundal or benthic zone, where little sunlight can reach. The depth to which light can penetrate depends on the turbidity of the water, which is determined by the density and size of suspended particles. A particle will be in suspension if its weight is less than the random turbidity forces acting upon it. These particles can be sedimentary or biological in origin (including algae and detritus) and are responsible for the color of the water. Decaying plant matter, for instance, may account for a yellow or brown color, while algae may cause a greenish coloration. In very shallow water bodies, iron oxides make the water reddish brown. Bottom-dwelling detritivorous fish stir the mud in search of food and can be the cause of turbid waters. Piscivorous fish contribute to turbidity by eating plant-eating (planktonivorous) fish, thus increasing the amount of algae (see aquatic trophic cascade).

The light depth or transparency is measured using a Secchi disk, a 20-cm (8 in) disk with alternating white and black quadrants. The depth at which the disk is no longer visible is the Secchi depth, a measure of transparency. The Secchi disk is commonly used to test for eutrophication. For a detailed look at these processes, see lentic ecosystems.

A lake moderates the surrounding region's temperature and climate because water has a very high specific heat capacity (4,186 J·kg^{−1}·K^{−1}). In the daytime a lake can cool the land beside it with local winds, resulting in a sea breeze; in the night it can warm it with a land breeze.

=== Biological properties ===
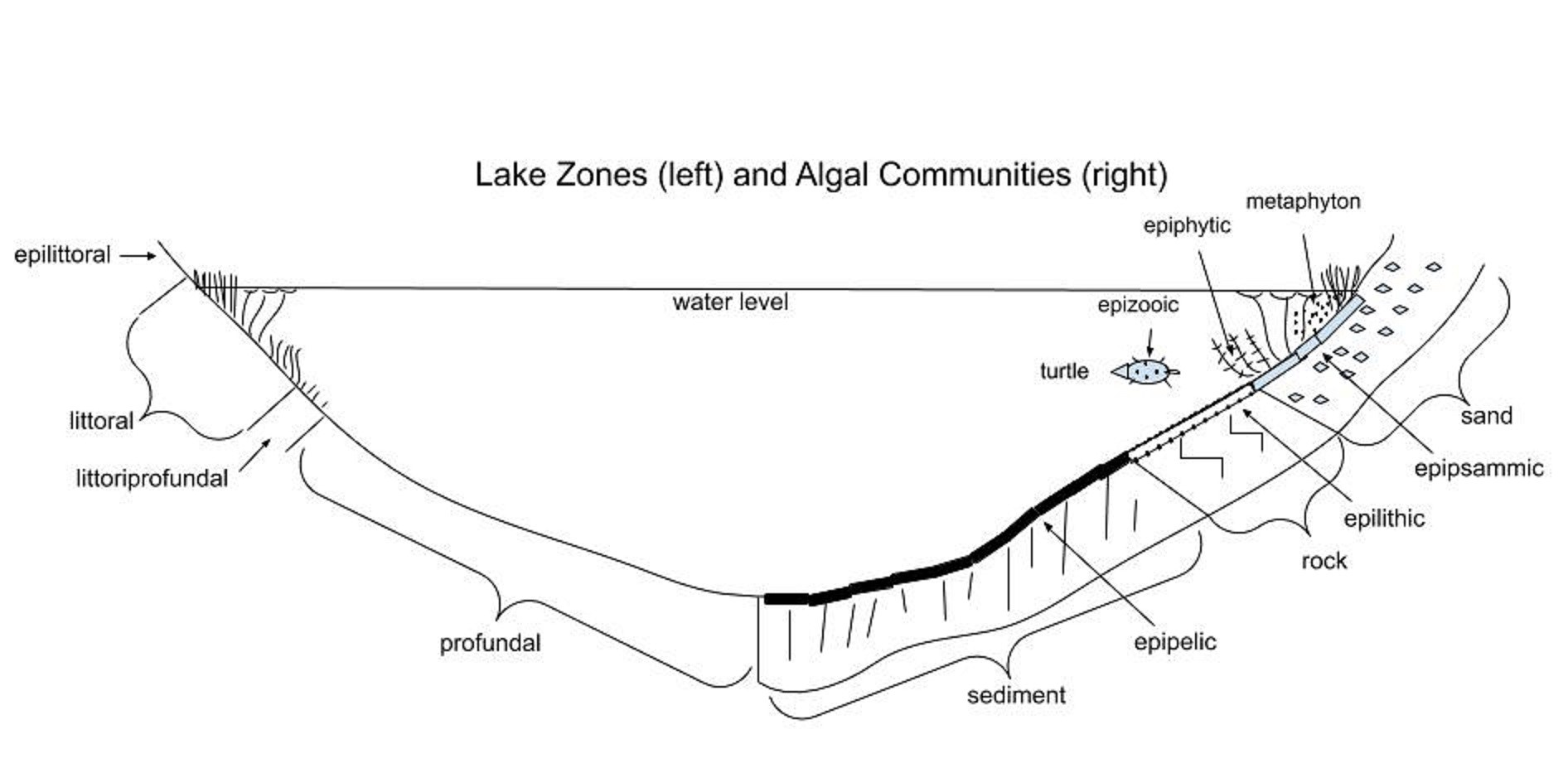
Cross sectional diagram of limnological lake zones (left) and algal community types (right)

Lake zones:

- Epilittoral: The zone that is entirely above the lake's normal water level and never submerged by lake water
- Littoral: The zone that encompasses the small area above the normal water level (which is sometimes submerged when the lake's water level increases), reaching to the deepest part of the lake that still allows for submerged macrophytic growth
- Littoriprofundal: Transition zone commonly aligned with stratified lakes' metalimnions – too deep for macrophytes but includes photosynthetic algae and bacteria
- Profundal: Sedimentary zone containing no vegetation

Algal community types:

- Epipelic: Algae that grow on sediments
- Epilithic: Algae that grow on rocks
- Epipsammic: Algae that grow on (or within) sand
- Epiphytic: Algae that grow on macrophytes
- Epizooic: Algae that grow on living animals
- Metaphyton: Algae present in the littoral zone, not in a state of suspension nor attached to a substratum (such as a macrophyte)

== Disappearance ==
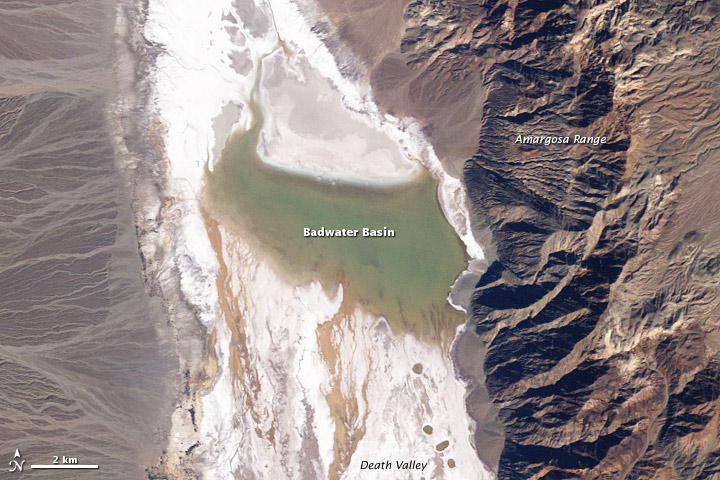
Ephemeral 'Lake Badwater', a lake only noted after heavy winter and spring rainfall, Badwater Basin, Death Valley National Park, 9 February 2005. Landsat 5 satellite photo

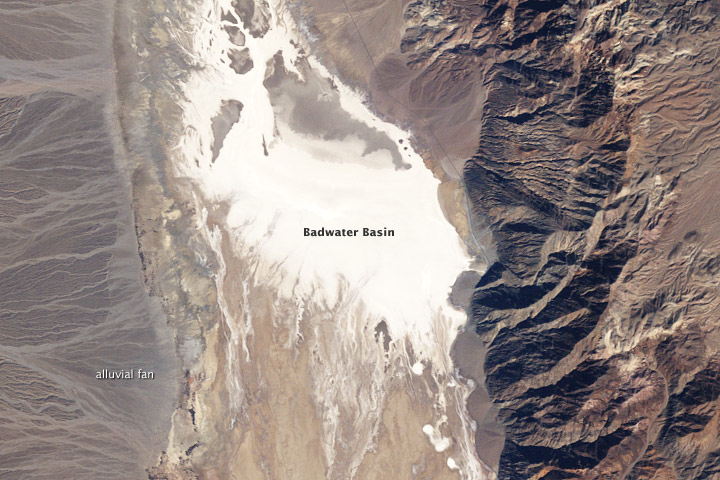
Badwater Basin dry lake, 15 February 2007. Landsat 5 satellite photo

The lake may be infilled with deposited sediment and gradually become a wetland such as a swamp or marsh. Large water plants, typically reeds, accelerate this closing process significantly because they partially decompose to form peat soils that fill the shallows. Conversely, peat soils in a marsh can naturally burn and reverse this process to recreate a shallow lake resulting in a dynamic equilibrium between marsh and lake. This is significant since wildfire has been largely suppressed in the developed world over the past century. This has artificially converted many shallow lakes into emergent marshes. Turbid lakes and lakes with many plant-eating fish tend to disappear more slowly. A "disappearing" lake (barely noticeable on a human timescale) typically has extensive plant mats at the water's edge. These become a new habitat for other plants, like peat moss when conditions are right, and animals, many of which are very rare. Gradually, the lake closes and young peat may form, forming a fen. In lowland river valleys where a river can meander, the presence of peat is explained by the infilling of historical oxbow lakes. In the final stages of succession, trees can grow in, eventually turning the wetland into a forest.

Some lakes can disappear seasonally. These are called intermittent lakes, ephemeral lakes, or seasonal lakes and can be found in karstic terrain. A prime example of an intermittent lake is Lake Cerknica in Slovenia or Lag Prau Pulte in Graubünden. Other intermittent lakes are only the result of above-average precipitation in a closed, or endorheic basin, usually filling dry lake beds. This can occur in some of the driest places on earth, like Death Valley. This occurred in the spring of 2005, after unusually heavy rains. The lake did not last into the summer, and was quickly evaporated (see photos to right). A more commonly filled lake of this type is Sevier Lake of west-central Utah.

Sometimes a lake will disappear quickly. On 3 June 2005, in Nizhny Novgorod Oblast, Russia, a lake called Lake Beloye vanished in a matter of minutes. News sources reported that government officials theorized that this strange phenomenon may have been caused by a shift in the soil underneath the lake that allowed its water to drain through channels leading to the Oka River.

The presence of ground permafrost is important to the persistence of some lakes. Thawing permafrost may explain the shrinking or disappearance of hundreds of large Arctic lakes across western Siberia. The idea here is that rising air and soil temperatures thaw permafrost, allowing the lakes to drain away into the ground.

Some lakes disappear because of human development factors. The shrinking Aral Sea is described as being "murdered" by the diversion for irrigation of the rivers feeding it. Between 1990 and 2020, more than half of the world's large lakes decreased in size, in part due to climate change.

== Extraterrestrial lakes ==
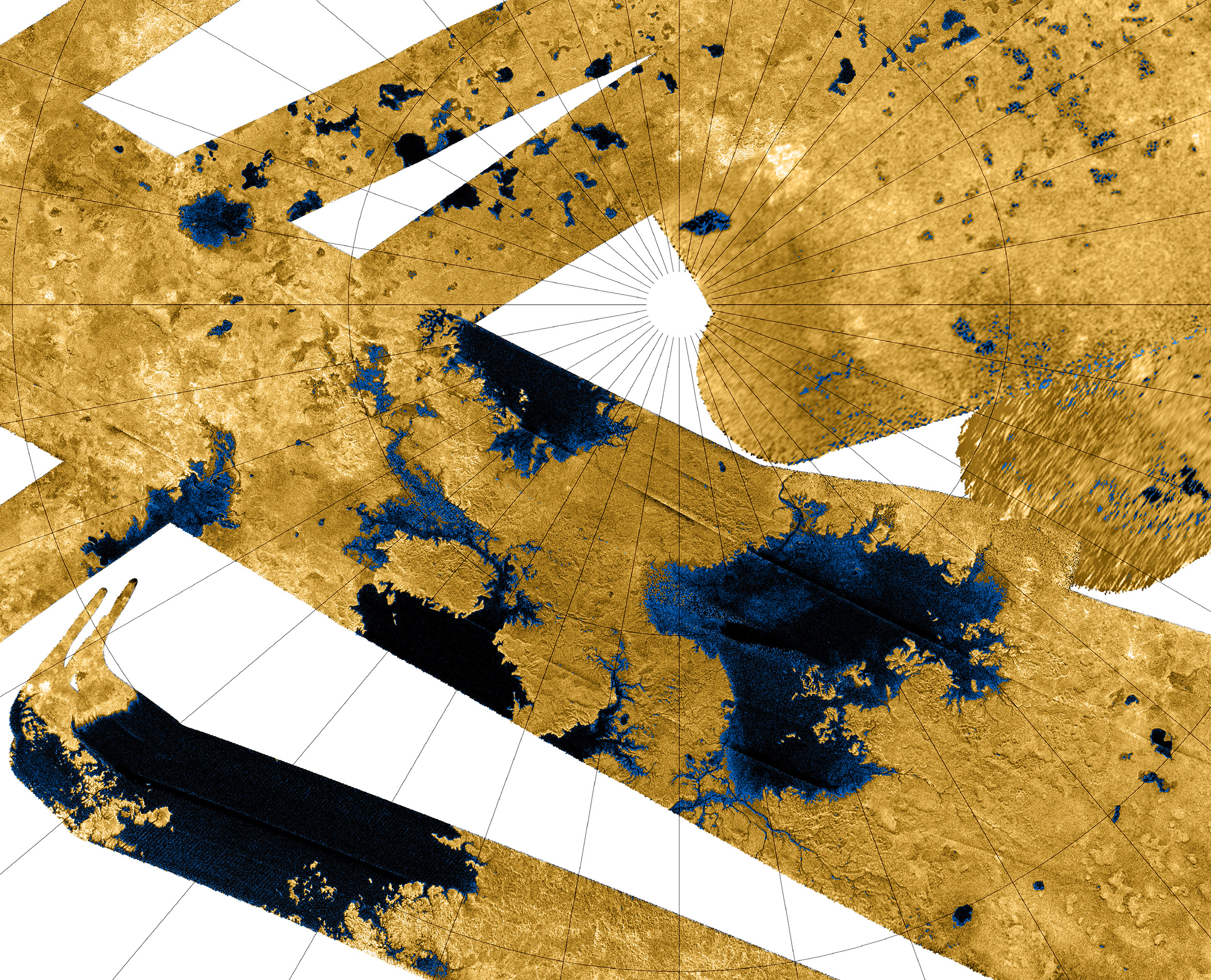
Titan's north polar hydrocarbon seas and lakes, as seen in a false-color Cassini synthetic aperture radar mosaic

Only one astronomical body other than Earth is known to harbor large lakes: Saturn's largest moon, Titan. Photographs and spectroscopic analysis by the Cassini–Huygens spacecraft show liquid ethane on the surface, which is thought to be mixed with liquid methane. The largest lake on Titan is Kraken Mare which, at an estimated 400,000 km^{2}, is roughly five times the size of Lake Superior (~80,000 km^{2}) and nearly the size of all five Great Lakes of North America combined. The second largest Titanean lake, Ligeia Mare, is almost twice the size of Lake Superior, at an estimated 150,000 km^{2}.

Jupiter's large moon Io is volcanically active, leading to the accumulation of sulfur deposits on the surface. Some photographs taken during the Galileo mission appear to show lakes of liquid sulfur in volcanic caldera, though these are more analogous to lakes of lava than of water on Earth.

The planet Mars has only one confirmed lake which is underground and near the south pole. Although the surface of Mars is too cold and has too little atmospheric pressure to permit permanent surface water, geologic evidence appears to confirm that ancient lakes once formed on the surface.

There are dark basaltic plains on the Moon, similar to lunar maria but smaller, which are called lacus (singular lacus, Latin for "lake") because they were thought by early astronomers to be lakes of water.

== Notable lakes on Earth ==
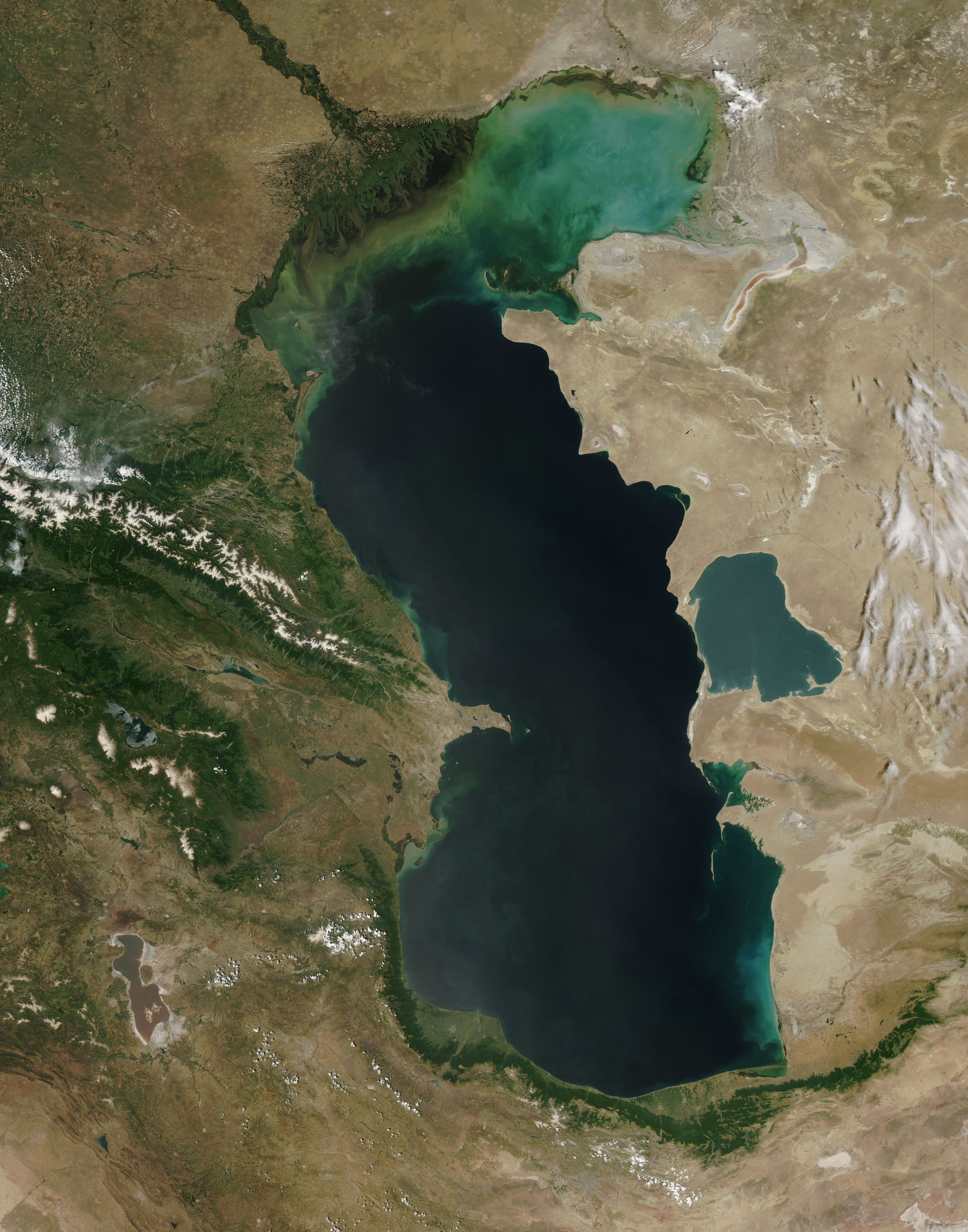
The Caspian Sea is either the world's largest lake or a full-fledged inland sea (Note: The Caspian Sea is generally regarded by geographers, biologists and limnologists as a huge inland salt lake. However, the Caspian's large size means that for some purposes it is better modeled as a sea. Geologically, the Caspian, Black and Mediterranean seas are remnants of the ancient Tethys Ocean. Politically, the distinction between a sea and a lake may affect how the Caspian is treated by international law.)

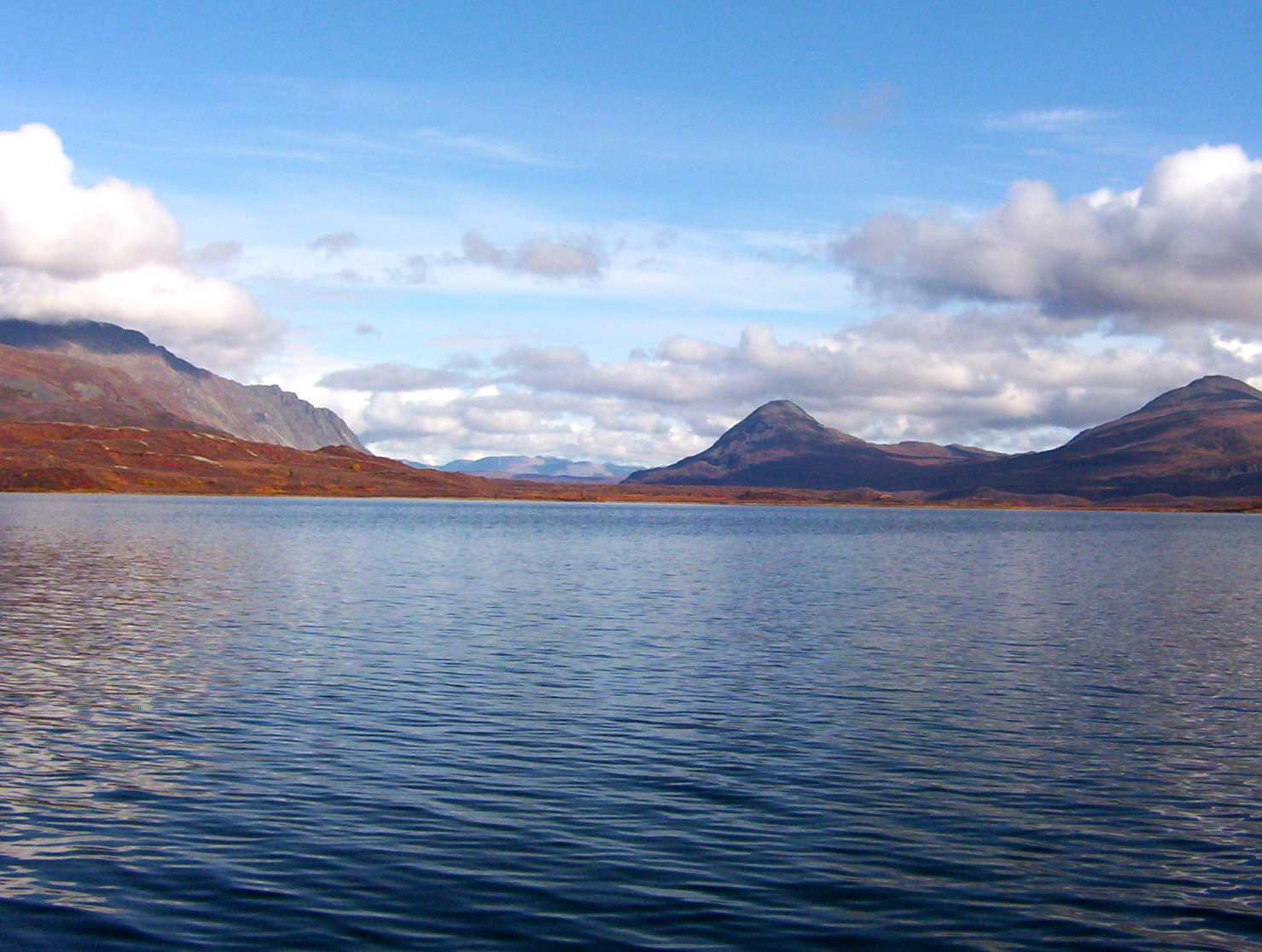
Round Tangle Lake, one of the Tangle Lakes, 2,864 feet (873 m) above sea level in interior Alaska

- The largest lake by surface area is Caspian Sea, which despite its name is considered a lake from the point of view of geography. Its surface area is 143,000 sq. mi./371,000 km^{2}.
  - The second largest lake by surface area, and the largest freshwater lake by surface area, is Lake Michigan-Huron, which is hydrologically a single lake. Its surface area is 45,300 sq. mi./117,400 km^{2}. For those who consider Lake Michigan-Huron to be separate lakes, and Caspian Sea to be a sea, Lake Superior would be the largest lake at 82,100 km^{2} (31,700 square miles)
- Lake Baikal is the deepest lake in the world, located in Siberia, with a bottom at 1,637 metres (5,371 ft). Its mean depth is also the greatest in the world (749 metres (2,457 ft)). It is also the world's largest freshwater lake by volume (23,600 cubic kilometres (5,700 cu mi), but much smaller than the Caspian Sea at 78,200 cubic kilometres (18,800 cu mi)), and the second longest (about 630 kilometres (390 mi) from tip to tip).
- The world's oldest lake is Lake Baikal, followed by Lake Tanganyika in Tanzania. Lake Maracaibo is considered by some to be the second-oldest lake on Earth, but since it lies at sea level and nowadays is a contiguous body of water with the sea, others consider that it has turned into a small bay.
- The longest lake is Lake Tanganyika, with a length of about 660 kilometres (410 mi) (measured along the lake's center line).
  It is also the third largest by volume, the second oldest, and the second deepest (1,470 metres (4,820 ft)) in the world, after Lake Baikal.
- The world's highest lake, if size is not a criterion, may be the crater lake of Ojos del Salado, at 6,390 metres (20,965 ft).
  - The highest large (greater than 250 square kilometres or 97 square miles) lake in the world is the 290-square-kilometre (110 sq mi) Pumoyong Tso (Pumuoyong Tso), in the Tibet Autonomous Region of China, at 28°34′N 90°24′E, 5,018 metres (16,463 ft) above sea level.
  - The world's highest commercially navigable lake is Lake Titicaca in Peru and Bolivia at 3,812 m (12,507 ft). It is also the largest lake in South America.
- The world's lowest lake is the Dead Sea, bordered by Jordan to the east and Israel and Palestine to the west, at 418 metres (1,371 ft) below sea level. It is also one of the lakes with highest salt concentration.
- Lake Michigan–Huron has the longest lake coastline in the world: about 5,250 kilometres (3,260 mi), excluding the coastline of its many inner islands. Even if it is considered two lakes, Lake Huron alone would still have the longest coastline in the world at 2,980 kilometres (1,850 mi).
- The largest island in a lake is Manitoulin Island in Lake Michigan-Huron, with a surface area of 2,766 square kilometres (1,068 sq mi). Lake Manitou, on Manitoulin Island, is the largest lake on an island in a lake.
- The largest lake on an island is Nettilling Lake on Baffin Island, with an area of 5,542 square kilometres (2,140 sq mi) and a maximum length of 123 kilometres (76 mi).
- The largest lake in the world that drains naturally in two directions is Wollaston Lake.
- Lake Toba on the island of Sumatra is in what is probably the largest resurgent caldera on Earth.
- The largest lake completely within the boundaries of a single city is Lake Wanapitei in the city of Sudbury, Ontario, Canada. Before the current city boundaries came into effect in 2001, this status was held by Lake Ramsey, also in Sudbury.
- Lake Enriquillo in Dominican Republic is the only saltwater lake in the world inhabited by crocodiles.
- Lake Bernard, Ontario, Canada, claims to be the largest lake in the world with no islands.
- Lake Saimaa in both South Savo and South Karelia, Finland, forms the much larger Saimaa basin, which have more shorelines per unit of area than anywhere else in the world, with the total length being nearly 15,000 kilometres (9,300 mi).
- The largest lake in one country is Lake Michigan, in the United States. However, it is sometimes considered part of Lake Michigan-Huron, making the record go to Great Bear Lake, Northwest Territories, in Canada, the largest lake within one jurisdiction.
- The largest lake on an island in a lake on an island is Crater Lake on Vulcano Island in Lake Taal on the island of Luzon, The Philippines.
- The northernmost named lake on Earth is Upper Dumbell Lake in the Qikiqtaaluk Region of Nunavut, Canada at a latitude of 82°28'N. It is 5.2 kilometres (3.2 mi) southwest of Alert, the northernmost settlement in the world. There are also several small lakes north of Upper Dumbell Lake, but they are all unnamed and only appear on very detailed maps.
- There are only 20 ancient lakes – those over a million years old

=== Largest by continent ===
The largest lakes (surface area) by continent are:

- Australia – Lake Eyre (salt lake)
- Africa – Lake Victoria, also the third-largest freshwater lake on Earth. It is one of the Great Lakes of Africa.
- Antarctica – Lake Vostok (subglacial)
- Asia – Lake Baikal (if the Caspian Sea is considered a lake, it is the largest in Eurasia, but is divided between the two geographic continents)
- Oceania – Lake Eyre when filled; the largest permanent (and freshwater) lake in Oceania is Lake Taupō.
- Europe – Lake Ladoga, followed by Lake Onega, both in northwestern Russia.
- North America – Lake Michigan–Huron, which is hydrologically a single lake. However, lakes Huron and Michigan are usually considered separate lakes, in which case Lake Superior would be the largest.
- South America – Lake Titicaca, which is also the highest navigable body of water on Earth at 3,812 metres (12,507 ft) above sea level. (The much larger – and older – Lake Maracaibo is perceived by some to no longer be genuinely a lake, but a lagoon.)

== See also ==
- Deep water source cooling – Air cooling method
- Great Lakes – Group of lakes in North America
- Lake monster – Lake-dwelling creature in myth and folklore
- Liman – Russian term for an estuary lagoon formed by a sandbar at a river's mouth
- List of lakes
- List of lakes by area
- List of lakes by depth
- List of lakes of the United States
- List of largest lakes of Europe
- Loch – Irish and Scottish Gaelic word for a lake or sea inlet
- Mere (lake) – Lake, pond, or wetland
- Open and closed lakes – Major subdivisions of lakes, for a description of the difference between exorheic and endorheic lakes
- River mouth – End of a river where it flows into a larger body of water
- Slough (hydrology) – Type of wetland
- Tarn – Mountain lake or pool in a glacial cirque
