= Lake Zaysan =

Lake in Kazakhstan

- Зайсан көлі (Kazakh)
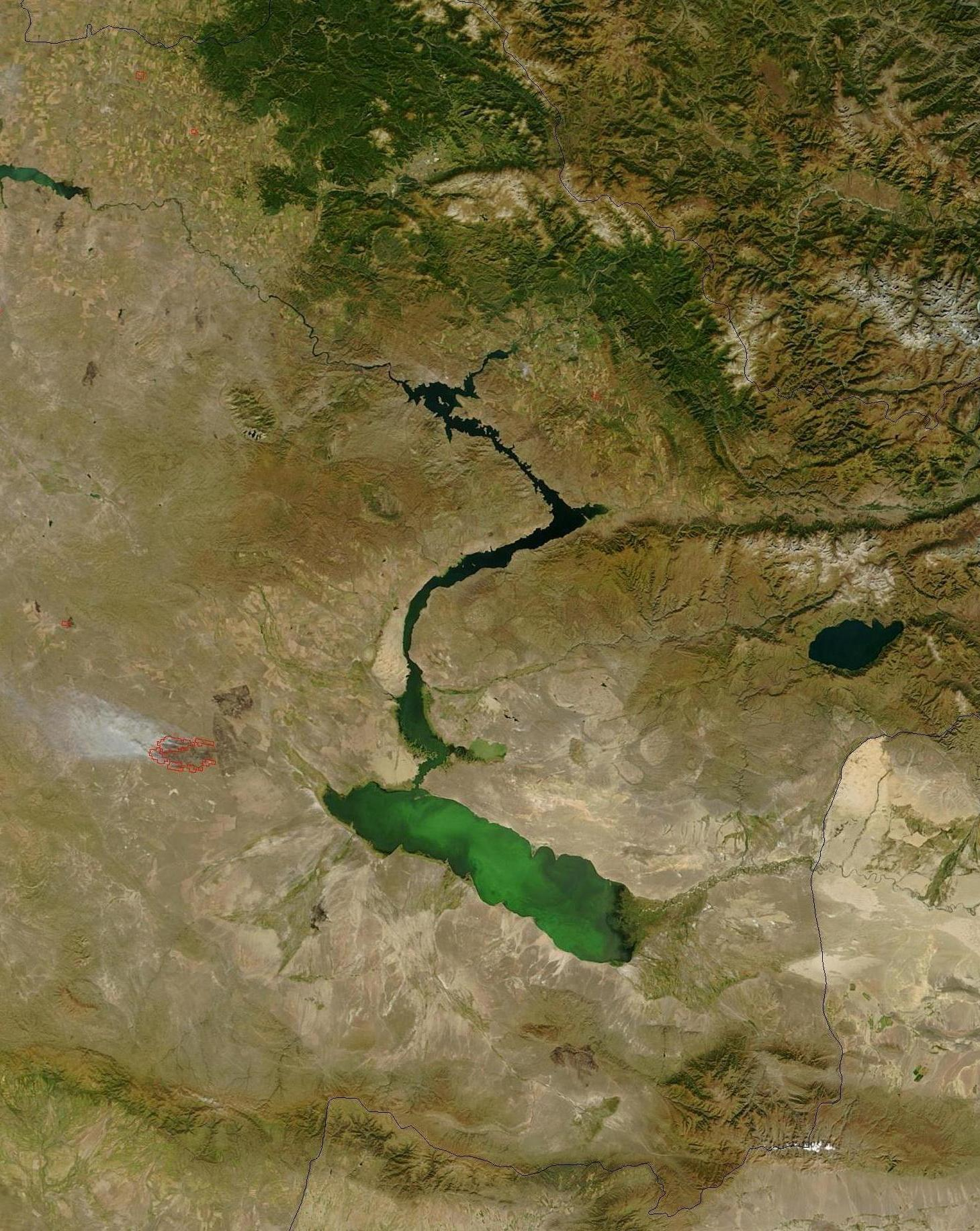

- Location within Kazakhstan
- Coordinates: 48°00′N 84°00′E
- Lake type: Ancient lake
- Primary inflows: Kara Irtysh (Black Irtysh), Kendyrlyk
- Primary outflows: Irtysh River (White Irtysh)
- Basin countries: Kazakhstan
- Max. length: 105 km (65 mi)
- Max. width: 48 km (30 mi)
- Surface area: 1,810 km^{2} (700 sq mi)
- Max. depth: 15 m (49 ft)
- Surface elevation: 420 m (1,380 ft)

Lake Zaysan (Kazakh: Зайсан көлі, romanized: Zaisan kölı, pronounced [zɑjsɑ́n kɵlʉ́]) is a freshwater lake in Tarbagatay District, East Kazakhstan Region, Kazakhstan. It is the largest lake in the region. The lake is generally frozen from the beginning of November to the end of April, but still has an abundance of fish.

The lake has been drying in the modern era, but that process has been stabilized by the construction of the Bukhtarma Hydroelectric Power Plant, whose reservoir it is now part of.

== Names ==
The Kazakh name of the lake is Zaisan kölı (Зайсан көлі or زايسان كولى), pronounced [zɑjˈsɑn kɵˈlɪ]. It derives from the Mongolian Zaisan nuur (Зайсан нуур), meaning "Noble Lake". Aside from its own nobility in size and beauty, it was used as the headquarters for various hordes and khanates, including the Dzungar Khanate. In the language of the local Dungan people, it is Jesonpe or Zhaisaonpe (Җэсонпә). In Russian, it is Ozero Zajsan (Озеро Зайсан) and, in Chinese, Zhāisāng Pō (t 齋桑泊, s 斋桑泊, x جَیْ‌سَانْ پُوَ).

== Geography ==
The lake lies at an altitude of 420 m (1,380 ft), in a hollow between the Altai and the Tarbagatai Mountains. It is 105 km (65 mi) long with an approximate width of between 22 and 48 km (14 and 30 mi). The major river flowing into it is the Kara Irtysh (Black Irtysh) and Kendyrlyk from the east; Its only outlet is the Ertis, or Irtysh River.

Since the construction of the Bukhtarma Dam on the Irtysh, downstream from the Zaysan, the lake has risen around 6 m (20 ft) above its natural level. As a result, the area of the lake has (essentially) doubled, from about 1,800 km^{2} to 3,500 km^{2} (or even to 5,000 km^{2}); thus, in some sources, the lake is indicated as part of an artificial reservoir. Man-made reservoirs are abundant over a large portion of the surrounding area.

Lake Baikal is often considered the most ancient lake in the world, as clear evidence shows that it is 25–30 million years old. Lake Zaysan, however, may be even older, dating possibly from the Cretaceous period, with a potential age in excess of 66 million years old (most probably around 70 million years); the exact age is debatable, and surrounded with some uncertainty. A clear indication of Lake Zaysan's age has proven hard to find, although some geological studies of the Zaysan Basin have been undertaken. Modern geological analysis of the entire field, apparently, supports an exceptionally old age for Lake Zaysan.

== History ==
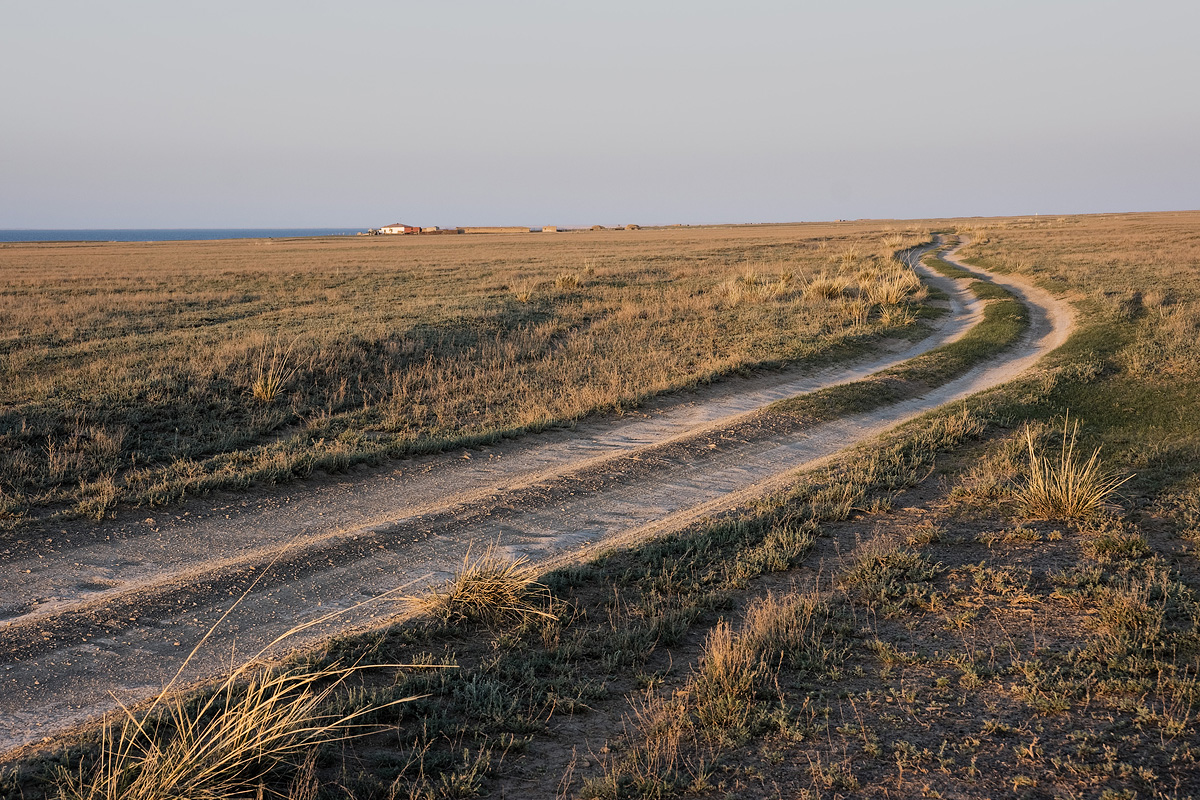
A road near the coast of Lake Zaysan

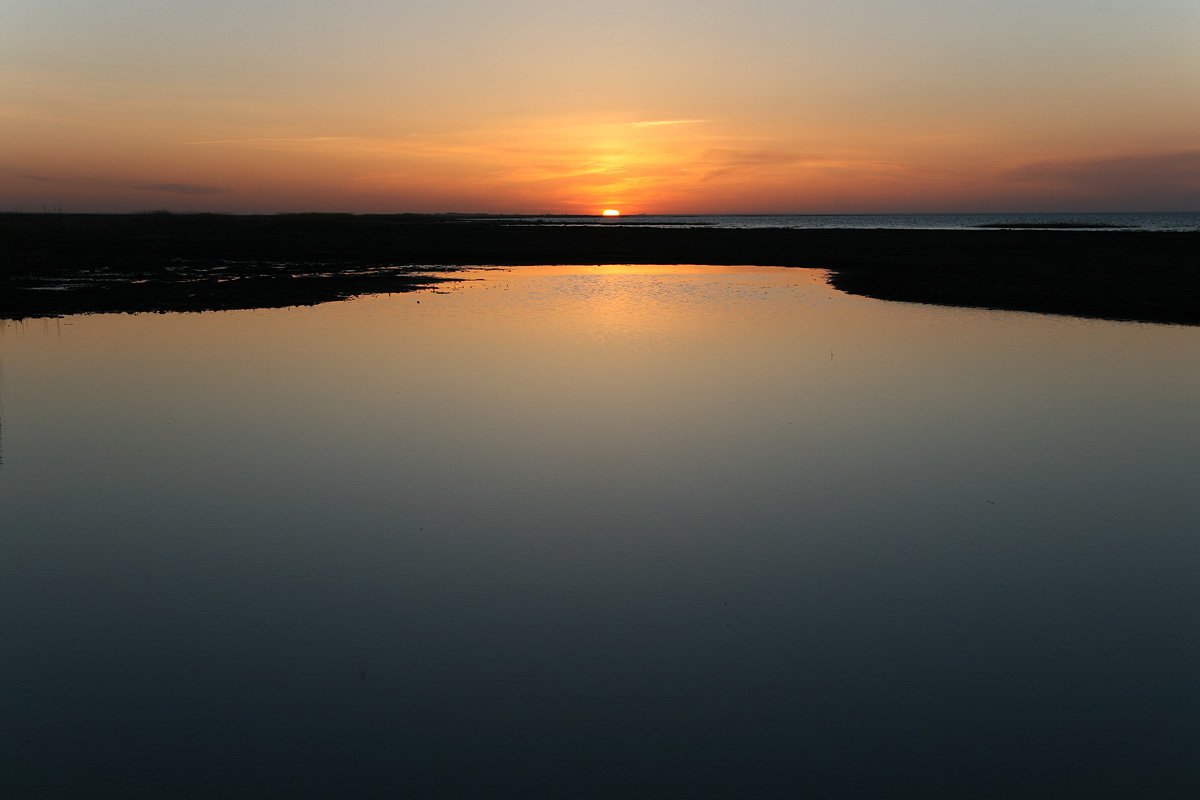
Lake Zaysan

In the third century BCE, the lake marked the rough border between the tribes of the Xiongnu Confederation and the Yuezhi. Later, in the early 2nd century, the Xiongnu successfully seized much of the area from the Yuezhi.

During the Han-Xiongnu wars, Lake Zaysan and the Black Irtysh were a point of contention between the Chinese Han Dynasty and the Xiongnu, with a notable campaign made in the region by general Huo Qubing.

From the early 4th century, Lake Zaysan and the Irtysh on either side of it came under the control of three successive Turkic empires: the Rouran Khaganate, the First Turkic Khaganate, and the Second Turkic Khaganate. After the reformation of the nomadic state by the Gokturks in the 500s and their subsequent division into eastern and western halves, Lake Zaysan was conquered by China's Tang Dynasty in the 600s during the Battle of Irtysh River.

After the loss of the Tang's northern possessions, the lake came to be governed by various nomadic tribes of the Karluks and the Oirats during the middle medieval period from the 700s–1000s. Two major powers controlling the region from the 1000s–1215 were the Kara-Khanids and the Qara-Khitai, the latter being overrun by the Mongol general Jebe in 1216. From thence, Lake Zaysan passed into Mongol possession. When the empire was yet unified, the lake served as a waypoint for large Mongol expeditions into Central and Western Asia from Mongolia, such as those of Genghis Khan (1224) and Hulagu Khan (1251).

The region continued to be administered under the Yuan Dynasty, before later being divided between local nomadic powers. Timur launched a military expedition to the lake and the Black Irtysh in 1391 in pursuit of the Moghul khan Qumaruddin Dughlat.

The first Russian to reach the area was Ivan Bukholts who ascended the Irtysh to build a fort and search for gold. In 1715 he was driven back downriver by the Oirats, who had established the Zunghar Khanate in the region.

The Chinese Qing Empire conquered the Zunghar state in the 1750s. This prompted an increase in the Russian authorities' attention to their borderland; in 1756, the Orenburg Governor Ivan Neplyuyev even proposed the annexation of the Lake Zaysan region, but this project was forestalled by Chinese successes. Concerns were raised in Russia (1759) about the (theoretical) possibility of a Chinese fleet sailing from Lake Zaysan down the Irtysh and into Western Siberia. A Russian expedition visited Lake Zaysan in 1764, and concluded that such a riverine invasion would not be likely. Nonetheless, a chain of Russian pickets was established on the Bukhtarma River, north of Lake Zaysan. Thus the border between the two empires in the Irtysh basin became roughly delineated, with a (sparse) chain of guard posts on both sides.

The situation on the Zaysan in the mid-19th century is described in a report by A. Abramof (1865). Even though the Zaysan region was recognized by both parties as part of the Qing Empire, it had been annually used by fishing expeditions sent by the Siberian Cossack Host. These summer expeditions started in 1803. And in 1822–1825, their range was expanded through the entire Lake Zaysan and to the mouth of the Black Irtysh. Through the mid-19th century, the Qing presence on the upper Irtysh was mostly limited to the annual visit of the Qing amban from Chuguchak to one of the Cossacks' fishing stations (Batavski Piket).

The border between the Russian and the Qing empires in the Irtysh basin was established along the line fairly similar to China's modern border with Russia and Kazakhstan by the Convention of Peking of 1860. The actual border line pursuant to the convention was drawn by the Protocol of Chuguchak (1864), leaving Lake Zaysan on the Russian side. The Qing Empire's military presence in the Irtysh basin crumbled during the Dungan Revolt (1862–1877). After the fall of the rebellion and the reconquest of Xinjiang by Zuo Zongtang, the border between the Russian and the Qing empires in the Irtysh basin was further slightly readjusted, in Russia's favor, by the Treaty of Saint Petersburg (1881).

== See also ==
- Balkhash-Alakol Basin
