= Ephemeral acid saline lake =

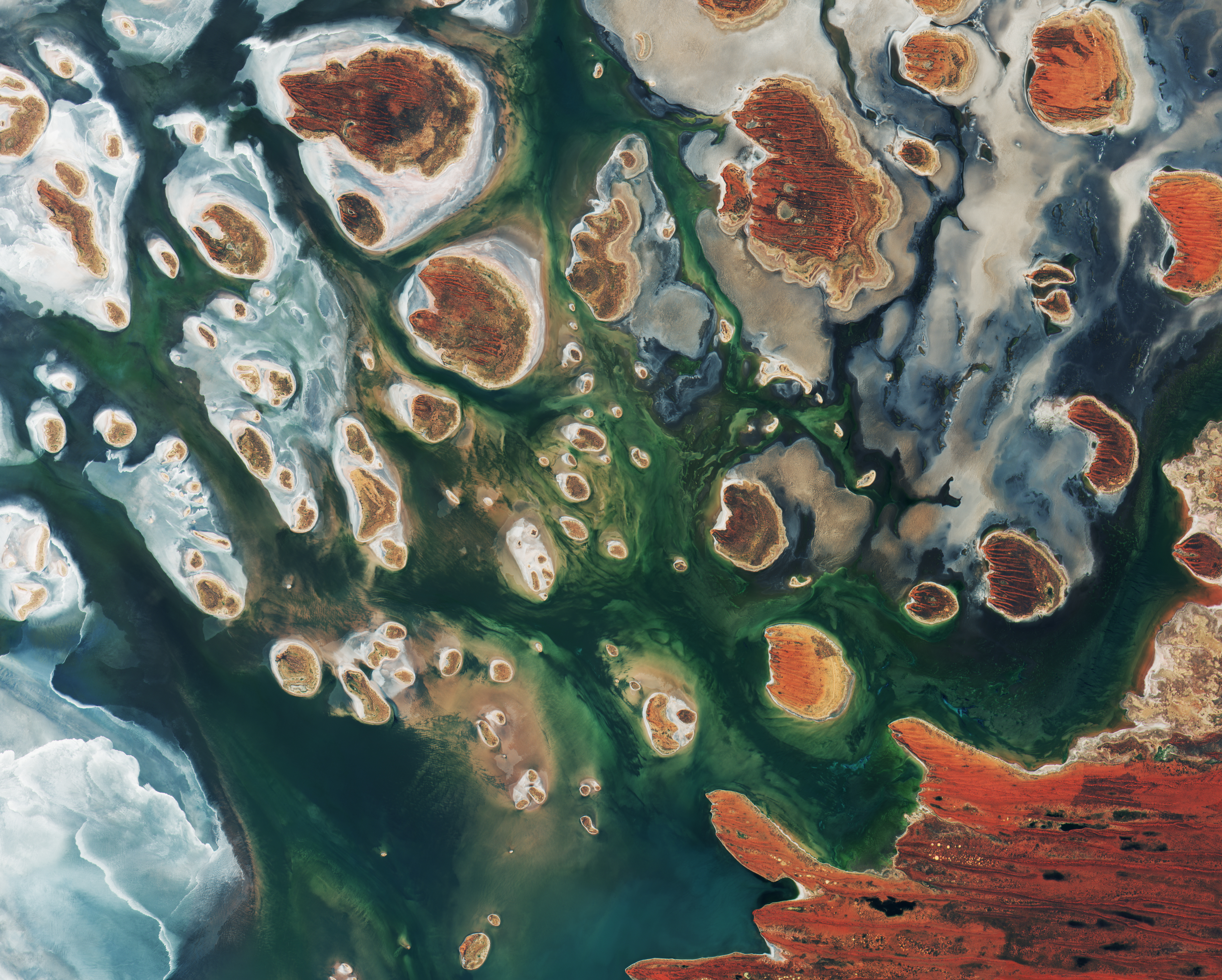
Lake Mackay, one of the largest ephemeral saline lakes that exist in Western Australia.

An ephemeral acid saline lake is a lake that is relatively high in dissolved salts and has a low pH, usually within the range of <1 - 5 and does not have standing water year round. These types of lakes are identified by high concentrations of evaporite minerals, notably halite, gypsum, and various iron oxides allowing the lakes to become hypersaline. Low pH and evaporite minerals are positively correlated, allowing lakes with lower pH's to have visible evaporite mineral "crusts". Due to the highly unusual geochemistries present in these lake systems, they are considered extreme environments in nature.

Due to the low acidity and high salinity, as well as the periodic total evaporation of the lakes, the waters are generally uninhabitable to life larger than microbes. The microscopic organisms that do live there possess a startling array of biodiversity, spanning from halophilic bacteria and archaea to acidophilic fungi. Because of the unusual ability for life to survive in such a harsh environment, acid saline lakes have recently been studied for their relevance to the field of astrobiology.

Acid saline lake systems are considered a rarity within the natural world, and the highest concentration of acid saline lakes occur in Western Australia. They form most favorably under semi-arid to arid conditions and have been closely connected to stable interior cratons and closed paleodrainage basins, allowing groundwaters to evaporate to the extreme salinity and acidity values present today. Unlike most natural acid saline systems, these lakes are unusual in that they are neither volcanically or hydrothermally fed and are not in direct contact with large sulfide deposits yet have brines with pH that can reach <1.

== Geology and geochemistry ==
The extreme acidity and salinity of these lakes are largely influenced by geological, climatic, and geographical conditions that have developed over the past 2 million years. Geographically, the lakes are located on Archean basement rock within the stable interior craton known as the Yilgarn craton. These ancient rocks were formed by closed basins via fault block valleys and have been incised by paleodrainage in the Eocene epoch. The most common rock are granites and gneisses, with anorthosites and quartzites being somewhat less common. The Archean complexes are highly weathered and deformed, and are economic sources of aluminium and nickel, along with other minor metals. As the craton is tectonically inactive and hasn't dropped below sea level since the Mesozoic, it has resulted in sparse zones of sedimentary rock layers such as lignite, siltstones, sandstones, and marine limestones. These deposits are primarily thought to have been deposited during the last two marine transgressions of the Tertiary, which allowed some of the incised valleys to be filled with seawater and other marine sediments. Paleodrainage from rivers ended in the lake Eocene and the Darling Range uplift successfully dammed river flow and created isolated lake basins. Because of the varied terrain, lakes can be hosted directly on basement Archean rocks while others reside on weathered regolith, Tertiary sandstones and limestones. As such, the varying geochemistry's of the lakes are in part attributed to the different water rock interactions due to varying host rock.

In addition to geologic setting, the climate of Western Australia plays a major role in how the lakes evolve seasonally. The lakes exist in a semi-arid landscape and are directly impacted by seasonal weather variations of South Western Australia. The dry season falls primarily during the winter months (June – August) and the wet season is during the summer months (December – March). Despite being semi-arid, the landscape usually experiences all four seasons with precipitation differences in each. During the wetter months the lakes will be at flooding stage, decreasing the acidity (median = 3.3). Conversely, during the dry months as evapoconcentration dominates and the lakes experience an increase in acidity (median = 4.4) and salinity. Meteoric precipitation also impacts precipitates, as halite and gypsum can be shown to dissolve after rainstorms. Rainfall also washes in organic matter from local flora and fauna into the lakes, increasing the total dissolved solid content.

Geochemically, the average pH range of the lakes are from >1 to 5 and the average salinity is >25%, nearly 8 times that of seawater. Most of the Western Australian waters are sodium chloride (NaCl) brines with varying, but regionally excessive, amounts of calcium, potassium, aluminium, iron, bromine and silicon (Ca, K, Al, Fe, Br, and Si). Most of the ions within the waters are Na and Cl (~88%) but can vary from 60% - 98% in some lakes. The most acidic of the lakes (ex. Wave Rock Lake, pH 1.7) has the lowest Na and Cl ions, with much higher concentration of other common ions.

Many elemental components within the lake systems are made up of ions that are usually only found in trace amounts in other natural lakes. The more acidic the waters are, the more recorded Fe, Al, and Si elemental compounds. Conversely, waters with pH's higher than 4 are nearly void of HCO_{3}^{−}. The amount of Fe in the waters has a positive correlation with salinity, with the higher the salinity of the water the higher Fe value is present. However, this same correlation is not seen with Al and Si ions. Even more different than usual brines, in acid saline systems the amount of Al is magnitudes higher than that of Ca. Some of the most concentrated Al is at 8000mg/L, which is much higher than that of acid mine waters or seawaters.

Other trace ions are present in these lakes in large amounts as well. On average, strontium (Sr) values can get up to 65mg/L and increase with salinity. 59% of the sampled waters have detectable amounts of Mn (>46 mg/L) and Cu (<9.5 mg/L). Less common trace ions include zinc, nickel, molybdenum and cobalt (Zn, Ni, Mo, and Co) in detectable amounts, and show a positive correlation with increasing acidity and salinity. Other metal ions exist to a lesser extent but are not as high in values. Metals such as cerium, lead, antimony and tellurium (Ce, Pb, Sb, and Te) have been identified. In some lakes antimony concentration values exceed that of 3 mg/L, nearly 500 times that of the EPA toxicity limit.

High elevations of metallic ions and other trace elements are in most acidic of solutions represent the influence water-rock interactions play in the formation of these brines. Lakes that are close to nickel sulfide deposits and undergo oxidation are thought to contribute to local acidity. Lakes that are much farther away with slow groundwater flow are thought to be influenced predominately by the oxidation of the organic and sulfide materials hosted in the Archean basement rocks and coal deposits. During rain events when the acidity is lessened, the lakes quickly readjust to more acidic conditions. This is in part influenced by constant iron cycling and redox reactions that generate H^{+} ions.

Al-phyllosilicates (ex. kaolinite and Fe-muscovite) are the main authigenic phyllosilicates in the lakes. They most likely form from direct precipitation from the acid lake waters, direct precipitation from shallow groundwaters to make cements, and alteration of feldspars and amphiboles. They are closely associated with other minerals within the lakes, such as gypsum, halite, hematite, jarosite, and alunite. The stability of the minerals are predominately controlled by pH and cation availability, and where kaolinite is typically most stable at neutral pH's in others waters, the positive function of Al and Si ions to increasing acidity allow kaolinite to precipitate at pH extremes.

== Relevance to Mars ==
Other crucial mineral formations that form within these lakes include Al and Fe/Mg phyllosilicates. These clays play an interesting role in the lakes geochemistries and have been studied to better understand how acid saline lakes could be a useful planetary analogue for Mars. While acid saline systems such as those in Western Australia are unusual on Earth, there have been similar sedimentary records found within the Mawrth Vallis and Nili Fossae regions of Mars. Additionally, clay minerals have been detected in these regions on Mars, which would indicate that large reservoirs of water had to exist for their formation. The existence of jarosite, alunite, acid-tolerant kaolin groups, and chlorides on Mars indicate that these areas could share some characteristics of the Western Australian lakes.

In the search for life on Mars, clays can play a crucial role in trapping and preserving organic materials. While organics are not well preserved within the clays of the lake system, they do record D values for formational waters that can shed light on potential habitable conditions. Other minerals in the lake have a higher affinity for preservation. Particularly evaporite materials, where rapid precipitation can trap and preserve organics within the crystal structure. Research done by Melanie R. Mormile et al. in 2003 show that microbes could be trapped as fluid inclusions within precipitating minerals such as gypsum and halite. Those microbes could be detected under Raman spectroscopy and X-ray diffraction analysis.
