= Lacustrine deposits =

Sediment deposited by a lake

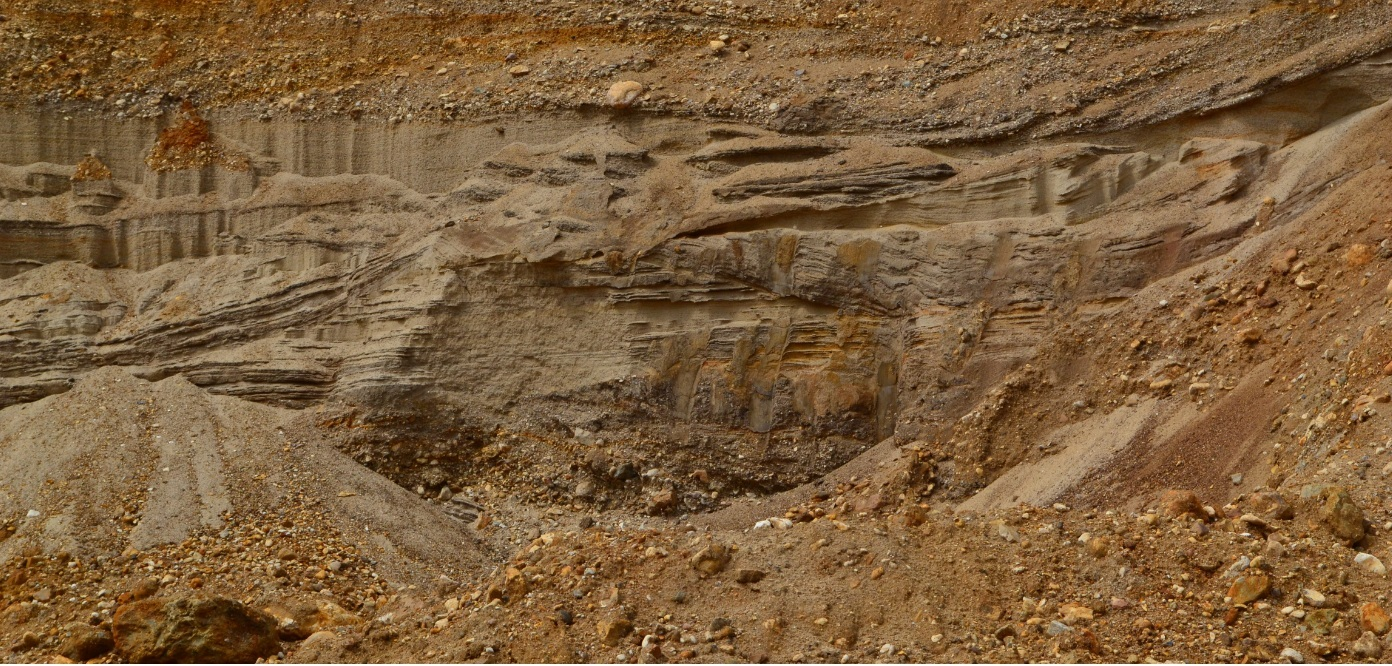
Lacustrine sands (Under Moscow, Lime Pit "Nikitsky")

Lacustrine deposits are sedimentary rock formations which formed in the bottom of ancient lakes. A common characteristic of lacustrine deposits is that a river or stream channel has carried sediment into the basin. Lacustrine deposits form in all lake types including rift graben lakes, oxbow lakes, glacial lakes, and crater lakes. Lacustrine environments, like seas, are large bodies of water. They share similar sedimentary deposits which are mainly composed of low-energy particle sizes. Lacustrine deposits are typically very well sorted with highly laminated beds of silts, clays, and occasionally carbonates. In regards to geologic time, lakes are temporary and once they no longer receive water, they dry up and leave a formation.

== Lake types ==
Lacustrine deposits can form in every variety of basins found in nature. How each basin originates is where the distinction between lacustrine deposit types stem. Rift graben lakes are formed from crustal stretching also known as rifting. Sediment influx is typically dominated by precipitation runoff and discharge through channels migrating towards the depression. Oxbow lakes form lacustrine deposits from seasonal overbank flooding as well as precipitation runoff which refills these isolated basins with fresh water and new sediments. Glacial lakes form when terminal moraines block water from escaping the newly carved valley from glacial erosion. As the glacier melts, the valley fills with melt water that creates a glacial lake. Crater lakes can be meteoritic or of the caldera variety. Crater lakes sediments are provided from precipitation runoff descending their steep slopes.

== Resource value ==
Lacustrine deposits have gained more attention recently due to containing valuable source rocks of oil, coal, and uranium. Lacustrine deposits generally provide productive mining conditions but can prove challenging when underground mines are attempted due to the poor shear strength of clays and silts as well as the amount of moisture often locked in the layers due to a low permeability characteristic of lacustrine deposits. Ephemeral lakes have recently been found to be especially valuable due to their seasonal wetting and drying out characteristic. Between the wet and the dry seasons, there is a time period when organic matter has the perfect opportunity to generate, only to be submerged by the influx of water during the wet season. This action creates a prime combination of organic matter, silts and clays to create oil shales or coal deposits.

== See also ==
- Glaciolacustrine deposits
