= Ancient lake =

Lakes formed before the last glacial maximum

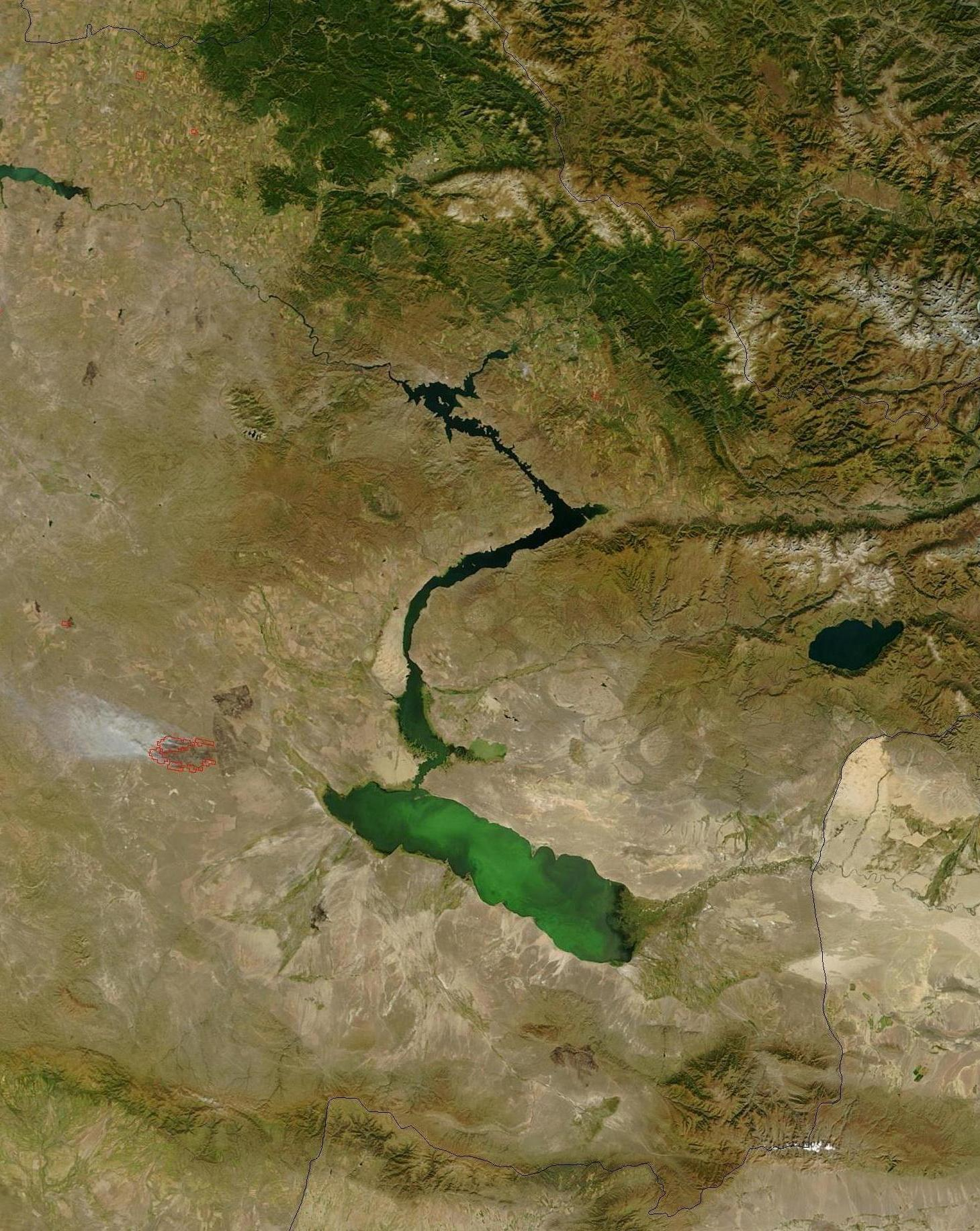
Lake Zaysan in Kazakhstan is one of the oldest lakes in the world.

The term ancient lake has two different meanings. For biologists, an ancient lake has consistently carried water for a geologically significant amount of time, typically more than one million years. For paleontologists, an ancient lake is paleo-evidence of a lake, a lake bed evident in geology.

Biologically ancient lakes existed before the latest glacial maximum. Due to the prolonged life of ancient lakes, they serve as models for isolated evolutionary traits and speciation. Lake Baikal is considered the oldest, as clear evidence shows that it is 25–30 million years old. Most of the world's bodies of water are less than 18,000 years old.

== Paleo-lakes ==
Modern lakes have many complex processes and interactions making their classification difficult. Ancient lakes are relatively simple.

=== Stratigraphy ===
Ancient lakes show three characteristic geological traits: indistinctly sequenced layers with evidence of fresh water biology called fluvial-lacustrine, distinct cyclic layers with mixed salt and saline biota called fluctuating profundal (deep water lakes of variable depth), and high-frequency cyclic layering with primary salt water biologic evidence called evaporative traits. These traits have been traced to a balance between tectonic activity increasing sediment and climate changes altering the water fill rates. For overfilled lakes, high inflow keeps the lake full with minimal level variations, leading to fluvial-lacustrine stratigraphy. Balance filled lakes fluctuate as the balance shifts, with these shifts recorded in the sediments. Underfilled lakes have no outflow and alternate between flooding and desiccation, leading to the evaporative stratigraphy.

== Biology ==
Biologists are interested in long-lived lakes as possible evolutionary reservoirs. Such lakes have high biodiversity and more species specific to the lake. However lakes with long histories may not be stable habitats due to interaction with rivers and other bodies of water as well as geological or climatic changes that change the character of the lake. All major ancient lakes have seen significant surface warming and most have contaminants introduced by human activity, creating an urgency to their study before further alterations.

For example, Lake Baikal in Russia is an ancient lake 25–30 million years old located in the Baikal Rift Zone. This is compared to the North American Great Lakes, formed by glacial scouring and the pooling of meltwater, which are 14,000 years old.

=== Importance to evolution ===
Ancient lakes allow scientists to study the mechanisms of environmental changes over glacial-interglacial timescales. Ultra-rapid speciation has been documented in some ancient lakes, but no mechanism specific to such lakes has been uncovered.

=== List of ancient lakes ===
These are the ancient lakes in the world that have existed for more than 1 million years, excluding the many subglacial lakes whose age is yet to be determined.

Name	Origin	Type	Area		Volume		Depth max		Depth average		Countries	Notes
Name	Origin	Type	km^{2}	sq mi	km^{3}	cu mi	m	ft	m	ft	Countries	Notes
Lake Pingualuk	meteor impact	fresh, permanent, crater	8	3.1			267	876			Canada	
Lake Tahoe	tectonic	fresh, permanent	499	193	156	37	505	1,657	313	1,027	United States	
Lake Bosumtwi	meteor impact	soda, permanent, crater	49	19	2.24	0.54	81	266	45	148	Ghana	
Lake Tazawa	volcanic	caldera	25.75	9.94	7.2	1.7	423.4	1,389	280.0	918.6	Japan	Two lava domes on the caldera floor formed between 1.6 and 1.8 Ma.
Lake Lanao	volcanic	fresh, permanent	375	145			112	367	60.3	198	Philippines	
Lake Titicaca	tectonic	fresh, permanent	8,372	3,232	893	214	281	922	107	351	Bolivia, Peru	
Lake Prespa	tectonic	fresh, permanent	259	100	4.8	1.2	54	177	18.7	61	Albania, Greece, North Macedonia	
Lake Ohrid	tectonic	fresh, permanent	358.18	138.29	53.63	12.87	286.7	941	163.71	537.1	Albania North Macedonia	
Lake Malawi	tectonic	fresh, permanent	29,600	11,400	8,400	2,000	705	2,313	292	958	Malawi, Mozambique, Tanzania	
Lake Hovsgol	tectonic	fresh, permanent	2,770	1,070	381	91	267	876	138	453	Mongolia	
Kati Thanda–Lake Eyre	tectonic	saline, intermittent, endorheic	9,690	3,740	30.1	7.2	6	20	3	9.8	Australia	
Lake Tanganyika	tectonic	fresh, permanent	32,000	12,000	17,800	4,300	1,471	4,826	572	1,877	Burundi, Congo, Tanzania, Zambia	
Karakul	meteor impact	saline, permanent, endorheic, crater	380	150	79.8	19.1	230	750	210	690	Tajikistan	
Caspian Sea	tectonic	brackish, permanent, endorheic	374,000	144,000	78,200	18,800	1,025	3,363	182	597	Azerbaijan, Iran, Kazakhstan, Russia, Turkmenistan	
Aral Sea	tectonic	saline, permanent	64,500	24,900	625	150	67	220	16	52	Kazakhstan, Uzbekistan	Formerly the fourth largest lake in the world with an area of 68,000 km^{2} (26,300 sq mi). By 1997, it had shrunk to 10% of its original size due to water that was diverted in the Soviet Era. It is now split into 4 smaller lakes. As of 2023, the Aral Sea has become mostly desert.
Lake Biwa	tectonic	fresh, permanent	674	260	27.5	6.6	104	341	41	135	Japan	
Lake Tule	tectonic	fresh, permanent	53	20	40	9.6					United States	This lake has become intermittent in recent years.
Lake Maracaibo	tectonic	saline, permanent, coastal bay	13,010	5,020	280	67	60	200	25.9	85	Venezuela	Historically it was an ancient lake. Now, it is a large tidal bay/inlet rather than a lake in the traditional sense. It is saline and directly connected to the Caribbean Sea, leading many to consider it a large lagoon or bay.
Lake Baikal	tectonic	fresh, permanent	31,500	12,200	23,000	5,500	1,741	5,712	740	2,430	Russia	
Issyk-Kul	tectonic	saline, permanent	6,236	2,408	1,738	417	668	2,192	270	890	Kyrgyzstan	
Lake Vostok	subglacial	fresh, permanent, subglacial	12,500	4,800	5,400	1,300	510	1,670	432	1,417	Antarctica	
Lake Zaysan	tectonic	fresh, permanent	5,510	2,130	53	13	10	33	5	16	Kazakhstan	The construction of the Bukhtarma dam inundated the lake, thus, in some sources, the lake is considered a reservoir.
