= Amictic lake =

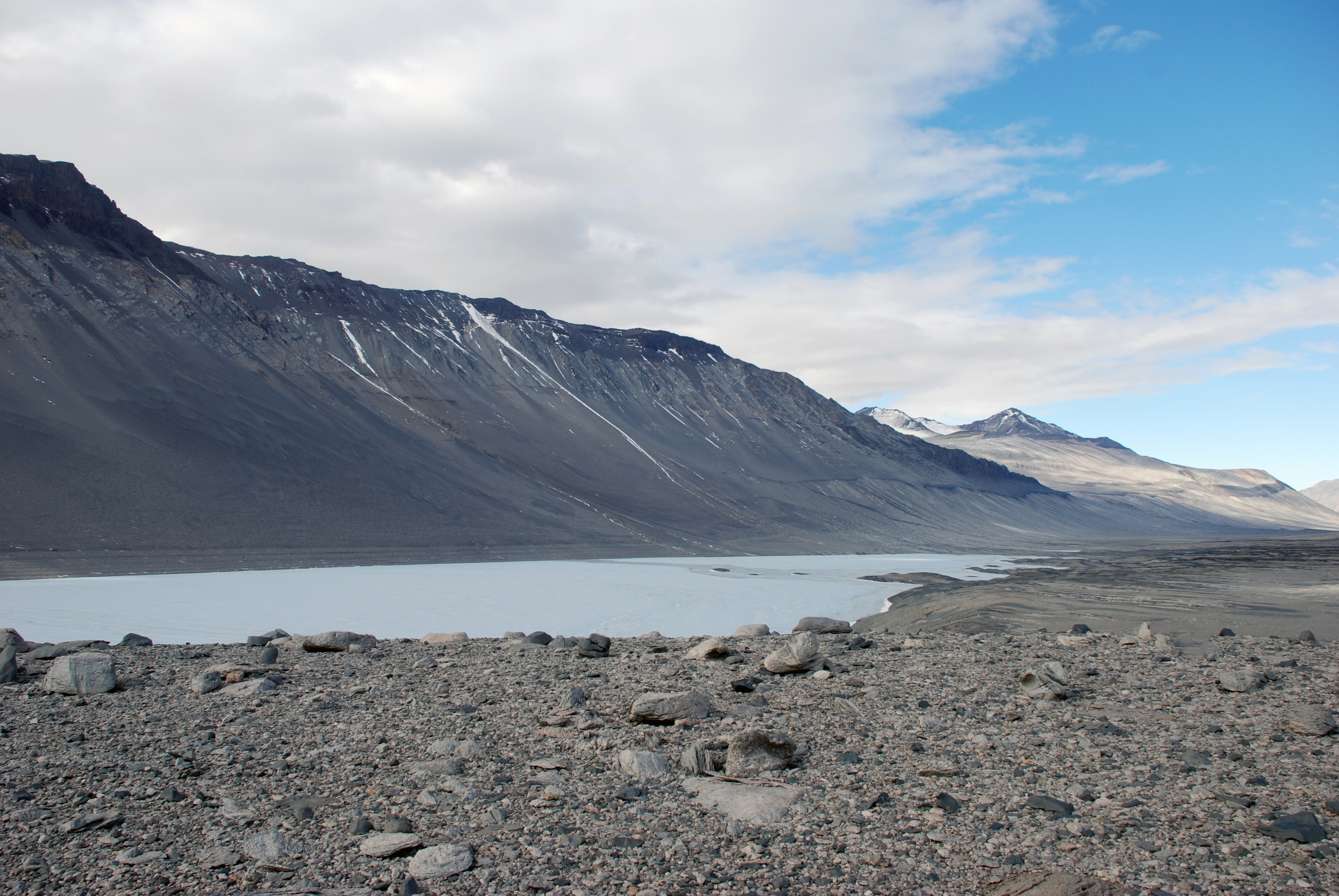
Lake Vanda, Wright Valley, Victoria Land

Amictic lakes are "perennially sealed off by ice, from most of the annual seasonal variations in temperature." Amictic lakes exhibit inverse cold water stratification whereby water temperature increases with depth below the ice surface 0 °C (less-dense) up to a theoretical maximum of 4 °C (at which the density of water is highest).

Hutchinson–Löffler (1956) classified amictic and other types of lakes based on physical/thermal processes. These processes are influenced by solar radiation and wind. They are strongly tied with seasonality and thus associated with latitude and altitude. Amictic lakes occur in Arctic, Antarctic, and alpine regions and due to permanent ice-cover, these physical/thermal influences have a limited effect on circulation in the water column. For this reason, amictic lakes are commonly referred to as lakes that never mix.

"Mixing" in this context, however, refers to homogenization of the water column and so the term "amictic" is not meant to imply that the lake water is stagnant. With the rare exception of lakes near the edges of the permanent icecaps in Greenland and Antarctica, amictic lakes do experience melting around the lake's perimeter during summer, resulting in a "moat" of water surrounding a thick pan of ice that remains in the centre of the lake. This melting occurs as a result of heat absorbed by water and sediments below the ice, particularly in the shallow-water areas, when snow does not cover the ice, and also by heat flow and meltwater runoff from the surrounding land. Mixing below the ice occurs due to density currents generated by heat from direct solar radiation and from meltwater runoff which may differ in density from the lake water due to both temperature and suspended sediment content, depending on its source and flow path. Despite these processes, the effects of wind at the lake surface are highly reduced due to the ice cover, and so vertical mixing of the water column may be incomplete. This may result in anoxic conditions, which has implications for biogeochemical processes within the lake.

== List of amictic lakes ==
=== Antarctica ===
- Lake Vanda in Eastern Antarctica
- Lake Bonney in Victoria Land
- Lake Vostok in Antarctica

== See also ==
- Dimictic lake
- Holomictic lake
- Meromictic lake
- Monomictic lake
- Polymictic lake
- Thermocline
