= Monomictic lake =

Lakes that mix from top to bottom once each year

Monomictic lakes are holomictic lakes that mix from top to bottom during one mixing period each year. Monomictic lakes may be subdivided into cold and warm types.

== Cold monomictic lakes ==
Cold monomictic lakes are lakes that are covered by ice throughout much of the year. During their brief "summer", the surface waters remain at or below 4 °C. The ice prevents these lakes from mixing in winter. During summer, these lakes lack significant thermal stratification, and they mix thoroughly from top to bottom. These lakes are typical of cold-climate regions (e.g. much of the Arctic). An example of a cold monomictic lake is Great Bear Lake in Canada.

== Warm monomictic lakes ==
Warm monomictic lakes are lakes that never freeze, and are thermally stratified throughout much of the year. The density difference between the warm surface waters (the epilimnion) and the colder bottom waters (the hypolimnion) prevents these lakes from mixing in summer. During winter, the surface waters cool to a temperature equal to the bottom waters. Lacking significant thermal stratification, these lakes mix thoroughly each winter from top to bottom. These lakes are widely distributed from temperate to tropical climatic regions. One example is South Australia's Blue Lake, where the change in circulation is signaled by a striking change in colour. A further, unusual, example is Deep Lake, in the Vestfold Hills, Antarctica. The surface of this hypersaline lake does not freeze in winter due to the depression of the freezing point by the high salt content.

== Thermal and density stratification ==
The identification and categorization of monomictic lakes relies on the formation of both an epilimnion (warmer, less dense water) and hypolimnion (cooler, more dense water) separated by a thermocline a majority of the year. The distinct separation of these layers of the water column are collectively referred to as the thermal and density strata. Thermal and density stratification is a critical factor influencing the composition of the water column. Composition often refers to the presence of or lack of nutrients and organisms. In both cold and warm monomictic lakes, the epilimnion and hypolimnion are separated for a majority of the year. In warm monomictic lakes, the water is in a uniform, liquid form; in cold monomictic lakes, the body contains a layer of ice and is cooler in temperature. Concerns and solutions pertaining to both warm and cold monomictic lakes are explored below.

== Nutrient dispersion ==
As warm monomictic lakes are entirely liquid, warmer in temperature, and highly productive, summer stratification commonly leads to eutrophication. This summer stratification is especially long in warm monomictic lakes. During eutrophication, excess nutrients are produced and depleted in a lake at opposite, vertical ends of the water column. This in turn dictates the growth and maturation of populations of organisms which tend to influence water oxygen and nutrient levels. In warm monomictic lakes, thermal stratification lends to oxygen depletion in the hypolimnion; a lack of mixing prevents the introduction of oxygen from the atmosphere into the water. This measure is known as dissolved oxygen (DO). When DO is lowered in the hypolimnion, nutrients like ammonium, nitrate, and phosphates tend to dominate. When oxygen levels are extremely low, the water is considered hypoxic and cannot support many forms of life. A lack of oxygen also limits natural chemical processes like the conversion of ammonium to nitrate.

A mixture of ammonium and nitrates is required to sustain plant growth; an overabundance of ammonium is linked to poor plant growth and productivity. In a lake, the overabundance of ammonium also indicates anaerobic and acidic conditions. This lack of oxygen modifies a lake's oxidation-reduction potential (ORP). The higher a lake's ORP, the higher the levels of oxygen present in the water. Ideal ranges are between 300 and 500 millivolts. Ideally, higher levels of oxygen aid resident bacteria and microorganisms in the decomposition of organic matter and dispersal of necessary nutrients into the water column. Conversely, a low ORP and low oxygen drives the release of sediment phosphorus via diffusion along concentration gradients through a process known as internal loading. Together, the increases in phosphorus, ammonium, and nitrate can drive the production of toxic algal blooms. Such blooms create a positive feedback loop of depleting nutrients and oxygen, and the subsequent release of nutrients needed to support their continued growth. Eutrophication can be both a natural and an anthropologic process; anthropogenic inputs are typically through sewage and waste water, or agricultural soil erosion and run-off.

== Combating eutrophication ==
A rather new hypothesis is a link between residence time of water and seasonal stratification in monomictic lakes leading to eutrophication. Increased residence time leads to longer periods of stratification, reduced water mixing, and increased eutrophication in the epilimnion. Some propose the development of interventions personalized to lakes to reduce these conditions. Such personalization refers to the manipulation of a lake's residence time to combat internal loading and eutrophication by reducing the length of a stratification time period. Current models utilize the redirection of water flow into and out of monomictic lakes to assist in overturn and the physical "flushing" of phytoplankton and excess nutrients. Such methods have shown to reduce residence time and stratification by days. While these time frames are limited in scope, they show potential to be lengthened for greater results in future studies and various lake models.

Hypolimnetic aeration and oxygenation aims to directly address lowered DO levels in a given lake which leads to eutrophication. By increasing oxygen levels in the hypolimnion, one aims to increase the ORP and reduce the rate and incidence of internal loading. Aerators are utilized to introduce oxygen, pure or atmospheric, directly into the water column. This is an especially expensive intervention given the electrical demands required to power such equipment. These costs make these aerators rather unsustainable as they are economically costly, and production of electricity can have environmental implications. Ecological threats have also been demonstrated. Use of aerators correlates to increased prevalence of gas bubble disease amongst fish. Yet, other organisms, such as zooplankton and fish, benefit from this process as increased aerobic conditions expand their territory in a lake.

Hypolimnetic withdrawal involves the withdrawal of water from a eutrophic lake at the hypolimnion at peaks of seasonal stratification. This water is removed to indirectly remove phosphorus. Upon addition of this water back into the hypolimnion, cyanobacteria growth is limited. This addition to the hypolimnion also reduces mixing of the water column and dispersal of nutrients to feed epilimnion algae. The physical removal of water can be either passive or active and is typically limited to minimize quality impacts on the water level. This water can also be discharged downstream and can have unintended effects. The low quality water rich in toxins and nutrients removed from the hypolimnion when transferred to other lakes can destabilize their water columns. In some cases, lakes treated via hypolimnetic withdrawal may also experience undesirable water-level reductions and overall increases in average water temperature followed by mixing.

Lastly, sediment dredging pertains to the direct collection and removal of sediment at the bottom of the lake. Removal of the top layer of the sediment aims to remove organic matter containing undesired nutrients. This method has measurable impacts on benthic organisms. It can take up to three years to restore the benthic organisms removed by dredging. Such organisms are essential to nutrient cycling in lakes and aquatic environments.

== Climate change ==
The largest factor that controls water temperature in a given lake is air temperature. Current changes and trends in global temperatures year round are a formidable threat to aquatic ecosystems. Current studies support that the combination of increased air temperatures and reduced precipitation impact shallow, monomictic lakes. In particular, their mixing may increase; this mixing lends to increased nutrient dispersal, anoxic conditions, and algal blooms. Southern regions may also see increases in salinity. Warm monomictic lakes that have experienced historically warm winters demonstrate greater thermal stability. This stability reduces mixing interactions and the oxygenation of waters. Furthermore, cold monomictic lakes may experience less cool conditions year-round leading to increased mixing and changes in thermal stratification otherwise unseen.

== Examples of monomictic lakes ==
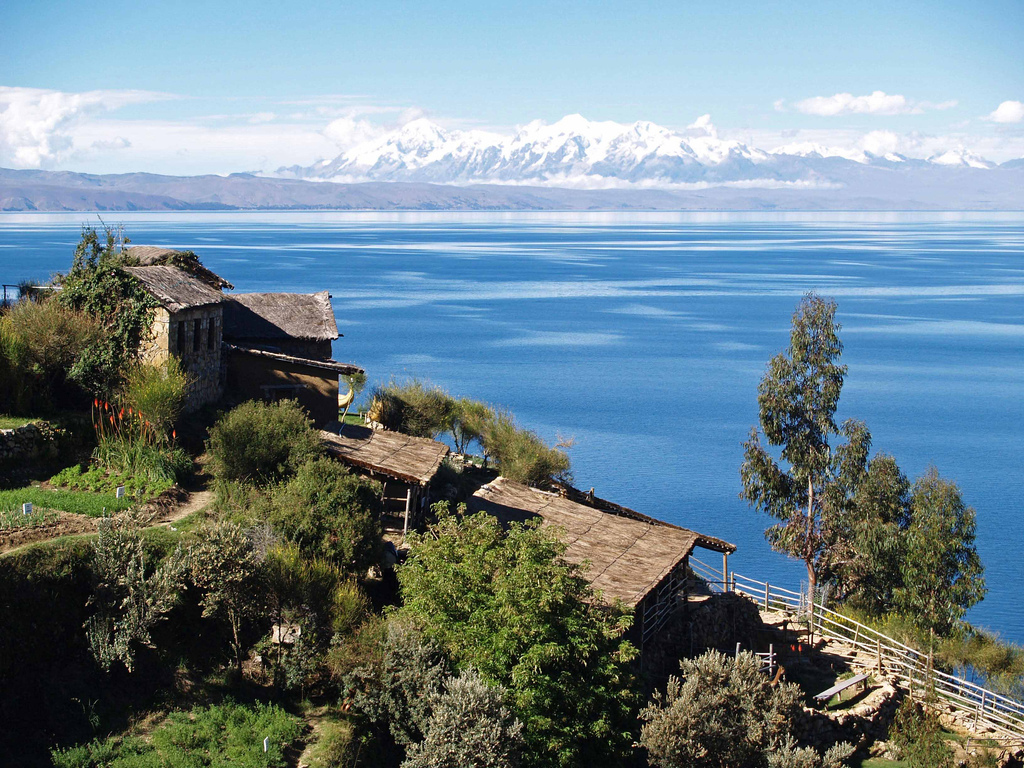
Lake Titicaca

- Lake Alchichica
- Blue Lake (South Australia)
- Dal Lake
- Sea of Galilee
- Great Bear Lake
- Hartbeespoort Dam
- Issyk-Kul
- Lake Kasumigaura
- Manasbal Lake
- Mono Lake - prior to 1941 water diversions
- Okanagan Lake
- Roodeplaat Dam
- Lake Sélingué
- Surinsar Lake
- Lake Titicaca
- Lake Turkana

== See also ==
- Dimictic lake
- Holomictic lake
- Meromictic lake
- Polymictic lake
- Thermocline
