= Holomictic lake =

Lake mixing occasionally during the year thus preventing stratification

Holomictic lakes are lakes that have a uniform temperature and density from surface to bottom at a specific time during the year, which allows the lake waters to mix in the absence of stratification.

== Details ==
Holomictic lakes mix at least occasionally, in contrast to meromictic lakes. Most lakes on Earth are holomictic; meromictic lakes are rare, although they may be less rare than commonly thought. Amictic lakes are sealed off by ice and never mix.

There are five types of holomictic lakes:

- Polymictic (mixing many times annually)
- Cold Monomictic (mixing once annually; exhibiting negative stratification)
- Warm Monomictic (mixing once annually; exhibiting positive stratification)
- Dimictic (mixing twice annually)
- Oligomictic (mixing less than once annually)

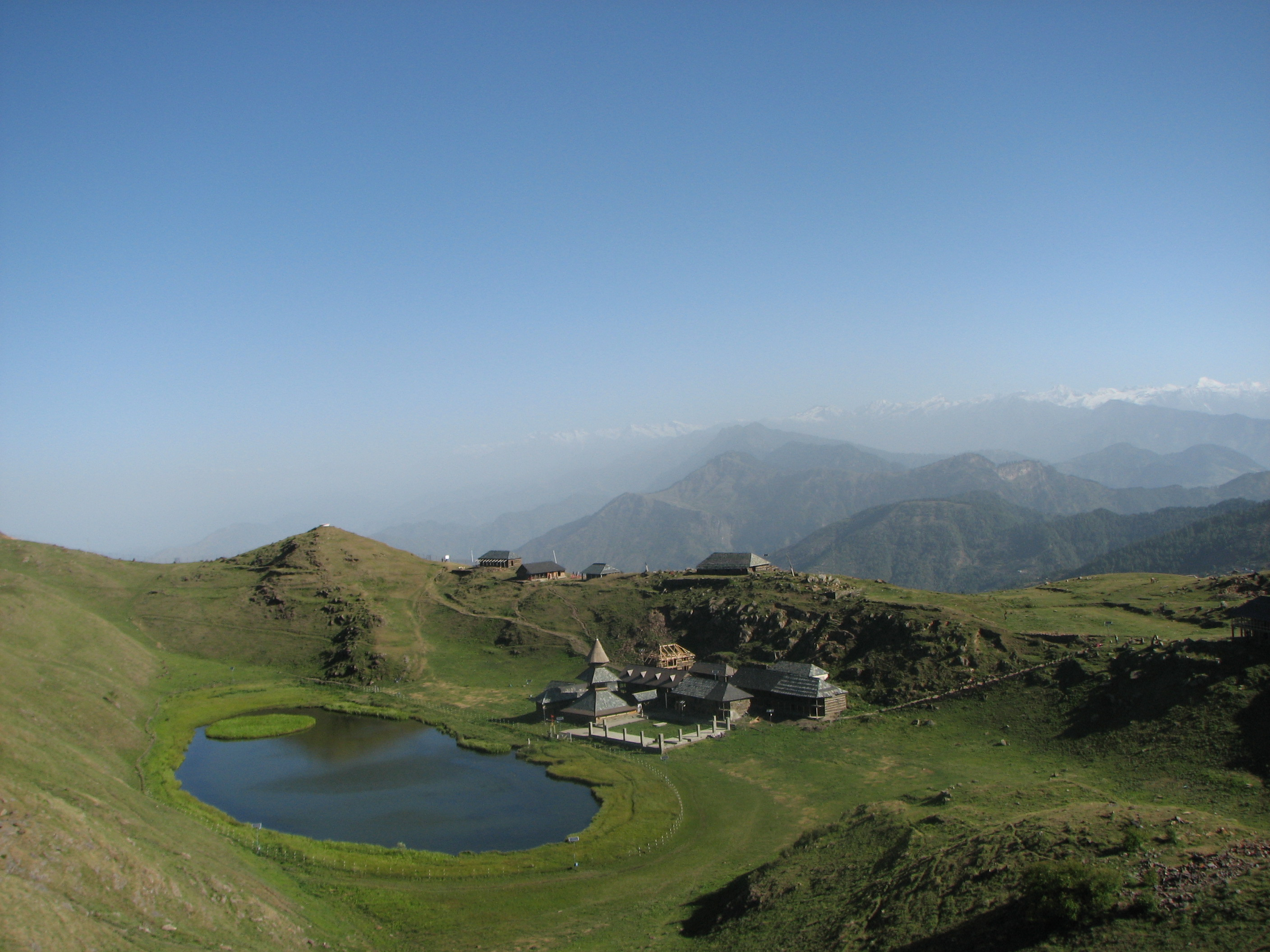
Holomictic type Prashar Lake

== See also ==
- Thermocline
