= Dimictic lake =

Body of freshwater that mixes twice a year

A dimictic lake is a body of freshwater whose difference in temperature between surface and bottom layers becomes negligible twice per year, allowing all strata of the lake's water to circulate vertically. All dimictic lakes are also considered holomictic, a category which includes all lakes which mix one or more times per year. During winter, dimictic lakes are covered by a layer of ice, creating a cold layer at the surface, a slightly warmer layer beneath the ice, and a still-warmer unfrozen bottom layer, while during summer, the same temperature-derived density differences separate the warm surface waters (the epilimnion), from the colder bottom waters (the hypolimnion). In the spring and fall, these temperature differences briefly disappear, and the body of water overturns and circulates from top to bottom. Such lakes are common in mid-latitude regions with temperate climates.

== Examples of dimictic lakes ==
- Lake Mendota
- Lake Superior
- Lake Simcoe
- Lake Opeongo
- Loch Lomond
- Lake Attersee
- Lake Altaussee

== Seasonal cycles of mixing and stratification ==
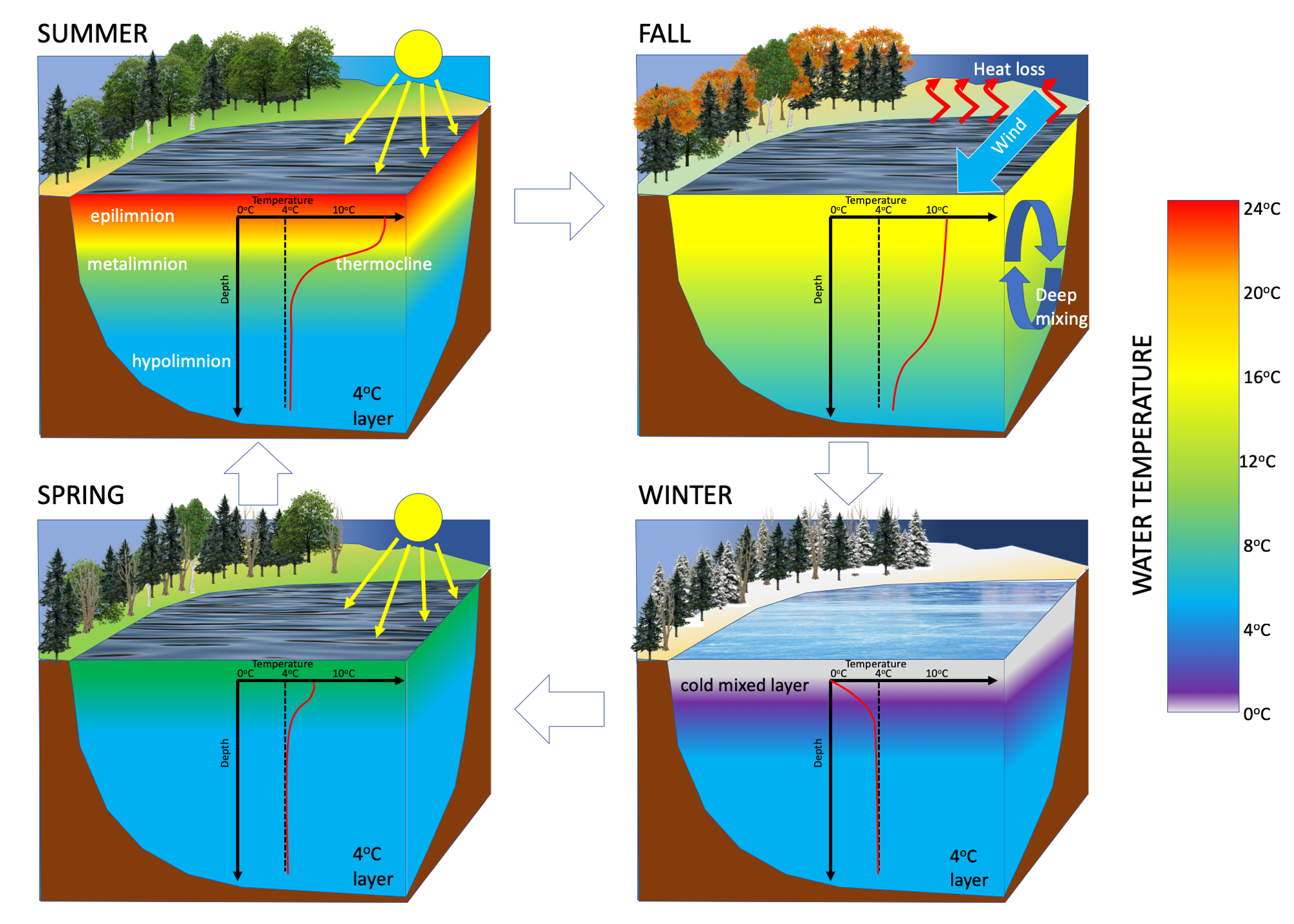
There is a seasonal cycle of thermal stratification with two periods of mixing in spring and fall. Such lakes are termed "dimictic'. During summer there is a strong thermal stratification, while there is a weaker inverse stratification in winter. (Figure modified from)

Mixing (overturning) typically occurs during the spring and autumn, when the lake is "isothermal" (i.e. at the same temperature from the top to the bottom). At this time, the water throughout the lake is near 4 °C (the temperature of maximum density), and, in the absence of any temperature or density differences, the lake readily mixes from top to bottom. During winter any additional cooling below 4 °C results in stratification of water column, so dimictic lakes usually have an inverse thermal stratification, with water at 0 °C below ice and then with temperatures increasing to near 4 °C at the lake's base.

=== Spring overturn ===
Once the ice melts, the water column can be mixed by the wind. In large lakes the upper water column is often below 4 °C when the ice melts, so that spring is characterized by continued mixing by solar driven convection, until the water column reaches 4 °C. In small lakes, the period of spring overturn can be very brief, so that spring overturn is often much shorter than the fall overturn. As the upper water column warms past 4 °C a thermal stratification starts to develop.

=== Summer stratification ===
During summer, the heat fluxes from the atmosphere to a lake warms the surface layers. This results in dimictic lakes having a strong thermal stratification, with a warm epilimnion separated from the cold hypolimnion by the metalimnion. Within the metalimnion there is a thermocline, usually defined as the region where temperature gradients exceed 1 °C/m. Due to the stable density gradient, mixing is inhibited within the thermocline, which reduces the vertical transport of dissolved oxygen. If a lake is eutrophic and has a high sediment oxygen demand, the hypolimnion in dimictic lakes can become hypoxic during summer stratification, as often seen in Lake Erie.

During summer stratification, most lakes are observed to experience internal waves due to energy input from winds. If the lake is small (less than 5 km in length), then the period of the internal seiche is well predicted by the Merian formulae. Long period internal waves in larger lakes can be influenced by Coriolis forces (due to the Earth's rotation). This is expected to occur when the period of internal seiche becomes comparable to the local inertial period, which is 16.971 hours at a latitude of 45 °N (link to Coriolis utility). In large lakes (such a Lake Simcoe, Lake Geneva, Lake Michigan or Lake Ontario) the observed frequencies of internal seiches are dominated by Poincaré waves and Kelvin waves.

=== Fall overturn ===
In late summer, air temperatures drop and the surface of lakes cool, resulting in a deeper mixed layer, until at some point the water column becomes isothermal, and generally high in dissolved oxygen. During fall a combination of wind and cooling air temperatures continue to keep the water column mixed. The water continues to cool until the temperature reaches 4 °C. Often fall overturn can last for 3–4 months.

=== Winter inverse stratification ===
After the water column reaches the temperature of maximum density at 4°C, any subsequent cooling produces less dense water due to non-linearity of equation of state of water. Early winter is thus a period of restratification. If there is relatively little wind, or the lake is deep, only a thin layer of buoyant cold water forms above denser 4°C waters and the lake will be "cryostratified" once ice forms. If the lake experiences strong winds or is shallow, then the whole water column can cool to near 0°C before ice forms, these colder lakes are termed "cryomictic". Once ice forms on a lake, the heat fluxes from the atmosphere are largely shut down and the initial cyrostratified or cryomictic conditions are largely locked in. The development of thermal stratification during winter is then defined by two periods: Winter I and Winter II. During the early winter period of Winter I the major heat flux is due to heat stored in sediment; during this period the lake heats up from beneath forming a deep layer of 4 °C water. During late winter, the surface ice starts to melt and with the increased length of the day, there is increased sunlight that penetrates through the ice into the upper water column. Thus during Winter II, the major heat flux is now from above, and the warming causes an unstable layer to form, resulting in solar driven convection. This mixing of the upper water column is important for keeping plankton in suspension, which in turn influences the timing of under-ice algal blooms and levels of dissolved oxygen. Coriolis forces can also become important in driving circulation patterns due to differential heating by solar radiation. The winter period of lakes is probably the least studied, but the chemistry and biology are still very active under the ice.

== See also ==
- Amictic
- Holomictic
- Meromictic
- Monomictic
- Polymictic
- Thermocline
