= Hypolimnetic aeration =

Deep-water aeration without disrupting the natural stratification of water

Deep-water aeration, also known as hypolimnetic aeration, describes the provision of oxygen from the atmosphere to meet oxygen demand in deep water without disrupting the natural stratification of the water above. This process promotes the development of aerobic conditions in deep water, leading to a significant reduction in phosphate dissolution and an improvement in sediment mineralization. Scientific studies support the effectiveness of implementing technical ventilation measures to maintain year-round aerobic conditions in the deep water, thereby restoring the natural balance of lakes.

== Eutrophication ==
During summer stagnation in stratified, eutrophic lakes, an oxygen deficit develops in the deep water. Increases in nutrient inputs raise the trophic level of these lakes. The nutrients promote surface algae growth and consequently increases oxygen consumption in the deep zones to match increased amounts of oxidative decomposition of increased amounts of falling organic waste from the surface zones. Consequently, sludge accumulates in the anaerobic environment of the deep water, leading to higher concentrations of ammonium, iron, manganese, and toxic hydrogen sulfide in the water. The hypolimnion becomes inhospitable, and the anaerobic conditions contribute to greater phosphate dissolution from the sediments into the deep water; these additional phosphate nutrient loads create further complications after the next full circulation. In the context of reservoirs and dams used for drinking water production, such deteriorations in water quality pose significant challenges, especially regarding compliance with the regulations set to ensure clean drinking water. Implementing deep-water aeration can help prevent this eutrophication process.

== Technical measures for hypolimnetic aeration ==
TIBEAN, also known as TWBA, is an acronym for the German term "Tiefenwasserbelüftungsanlage," which translates to "deep water aeration system."

The TIBEAN series comprises floating or submersible mechanisms. These mechanisms consist of one or more pipes positioned upstream, where the water is aerated as it rises, a degassing chamber, to remove gases from the aerated water, and one or more downstream pipes, through which the vented and degassed water is pumped back into the hypolimnion. Within the degassing chamber, it is possible to incorporate additional nutrient absorbers and/or nutrient precipitation devices.

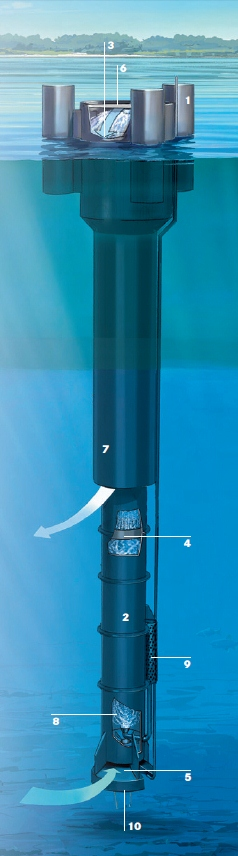
TIBEAN: technical components and functional principle

=== Technology ===
At the lower end of the plant, atmospheric air is introduced into the water using an ejector. This causes a combination of water and oxygen to be propelled upward in the upstream pipe. Upon reaching the end of the upstream pipe, the mixture enters the degassing chamber, where residual gases are separated from the oxygenated water. The gas is released into the atmosphere, while the oxygenated water continues its flow through the downstream pipe. The outlet is designed to provide a smooth, laminar flow and horizontal outflow into the hypolimnion. Flow and mass transfer calculations conducted during the technical configuration can determine the optimal setup for a given system.

=== Individual parts ===
The system includes the following components:

- Floating tanks
- Upstream pipe (resembling a telescope)
- Degassing chamber
- Mixing device
- Suction fence
- Covering fence
- Downstream pipe
- Oxygen input
- Submersible pump with ejector
- Main ballast tanks

=== Material ===
TIBEAN can be constructed using materials such as polyethylene, polypropylene, stainless steel, or an aluminum-manganese alloy.

== Applications ==
TIBEAN systems exhibit a high degree of variability, catering to a wide range of applications. They offer oxygen inputs ranging from 1.5 to 60 kg/h, can be used at depths of 5 to 50 meters, and provide flow rates of 600 to 7500 m^{3}/h.

The utilization of deep-water aeration systems can serve various objectives, depending on the specific priorities. These include:

- Preservation of deep zones as aerobic habitats for fish and other organisms.
- Reduction of nutrient concentrations in surface waters.
- Prevention of sludge accumulation, increased ammonium production, and the formation of toxic hydrogen sulfide.
- Cost reduction in the production of drinking water.
- Targeted treatment of deep water using coagulants.

=== Drinking water production in water reservoir dams ===
Deep-water aeration offers substantial cost reduction and enables additional technical treatment of hypolimnetic water, particularly in the context of drinking water production. As drinking water is typically sourced from beneath the thermocline in reservoirs, enhancing the quality of hypolimnetic water directly impacts the production of drinking water. Deep-water aeration can yield the following effects concerning compliance with drinking water regulations and the applicable limiting values:

==== pH and corrosion ====
The pH of drinking water has a threshold value of 6.5–9.5. pH values outside the neutral range (pH 6.5–7.5) are considered critical as they indicate the corrosion behavior of water. Slightly acidic water (pH 4–6.5) tends to corrode galvanized iron pipes, as well as copper and asbestos cement pipes, in a process known as acid corrosion. Unprotected steel pipes are generally not suitable for use at lower pH values as they promote the removal of the zinc layer. Natural cold waters typically exhibit a slightly alkaline reaction due to the equilibrium concentrations of dissolved carbon dioxide in the form of bicarbonate ions and carbonate ions, along with dissolved salts and gases. Higher alkaline pH values (pH 9–14) in the presence of oxygen can lead to oxygen corrosion. Buffer solutions are added to the raw water in drinking water production to prevent acid or oxygen corrosion. The pH-stabilizing effect of hypolimnetic aeration can reduce the need for these buffer solutions, thereby lowering operating costs.

==== Iron and manganese ====
The threshold values for iron and manganese concentrations in drinking water are 200 μg/L and 50 μg/L, respectively. While iron and manganese are essential trace elements in drinking water, slightly elevated concentrations of these elements are undesirable from a technical and hygienic standpoint. Under low oxygen conditions, iron and manganese dissolve as ions, with the majority existing as soluble ferrous or manganese compounds. At very high concentrations, the water may exhibit a yellow color. When aerated, the oxidation process results in the formation of ferric iron and manganese, causing red-brown and black precipitates, respectively. These precipitates can lead to water stains, turbidity, and laundry stains. They can also accumulate in pipes, leading to narrowing and deposition on fixtures. Iron levels above 0.3 mg/L and manganese levels above 0.5 mg/L can impart an unpleasant metallic taste. By creating an aerobic environment in the hypolimnion, deep-water aeration facilitates the oxidation and precipitation of dissolved iron and manganese compounds before the water undergoes further treatment in a suitable facility for drinking water production. This approach helps reduce operating costs associated with the removal of dissolved iron and manganese compounds.

The quantity and mobility of iron species also affect the redox-controlled phosphorus cycle. Divalent iron compounds originating from anaerobic sediment layers gradually diffuse and undergo oxidation at the boundary zone between aerobic water and anaerobic sediment. These compounds accumulate in the top sediment layer. The extent of this accumulation influences the effectiveness of the aerobic sediment-water boundary as a diffusion barrier for phosphate.

==== Nutrient concentrations and sludge formation ====
As previously mentioned, deep-water aeration has the capability to significantly reduce nutrient concentrations. The presence of aerobic conditions promotes the processes of nitrification and subsequent denitrification, contributing to the removal of nitrogen from a system. The oxidation of reduced substances like hydrogen sulfide and methane, both chemically and microbially, as well as the enhanced degradation of organic matter, can help mitigate sludge formation. Maintaining aerobic conditions in the deep water also plays a crucial role in reducing the redox-controlled redissolution of phosphorus from sediment and facilitating the reprecipitation of released phosphorus. Consequently, deep-water aeration offers the additional advantage of reducing costs associated with drinking water production by eliminating the need for denitrification stages or reducing the reliance on expensive flocculants.

== Planning and design ==
The design process for deep-water aeration plants consists of multiple phases. To begin, a morphometric measurement of the water body is conducted to assess the depth profile and determine the technical design requirements. This measurement is essential for identifying the optimal location of the mechanism. The precise technical design involves evaluating various parameters such as nutrient concentrations, temperature stratification, pH levels, temporal variations of oxygen concentrations, as well as performing calculations related to flow rates, mass transport quantities, and the distribution of suspended solids in the hypolimnion. These measurements and calculations are crucial for the accurate and effective design of a deep-water aeration system.

== Examples ==
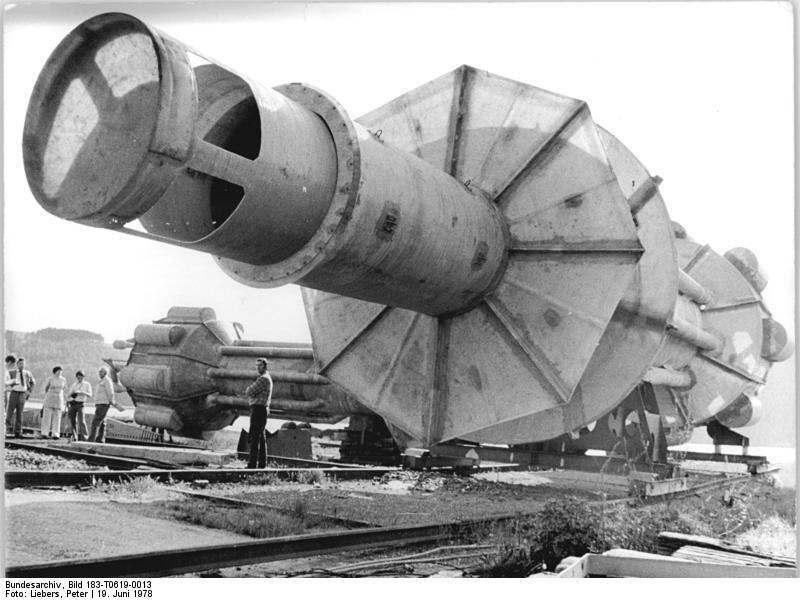
Deep water aeration system, type "Schönbrunn" on the Bleiloch Reservoir, 1978

- Lake Hodges (San Diego, California)
- Lake Marston (Littleton, Colorado)
- Talsperre Schönbrunn (Kreis Hildburghausen, Thuringia)
- Lake Muggesfeld (Segeberg, Schleswig-Holstein)
- Lake Krupund (Pinneberg, Schleswig-Holstein)
- Flensburg Port (Flensburg, Schleswig-Holstein)
- boat harbor Kiel (Kiel, Schleswig-Holstein)
- Eichbaumsee (Hamburg, Hamburg)
- Lake Sodenmatt (Bremen, Bremen)
- Lake Glambeck (Neustrelitz, Mecklenburg-Western Pomerania)
- Schlesersee (Carpin, Mecklenburg-Western Pomerania)
- Schmaler Luzin (Feldberg, Mecklenburg-Western Pomerania)
- Lake Achim (Winsen, Lower Saxony)
- Lake Sacrow (Potsdam, Brandenburg)
- Lake Poviest (Warthe, Brandenburg)
- Aabach Dam (Paderborn, Nordrhein Westfalen)
- Heilenbeck Dam (Ennepetal, North Rhine-Westphalia)
- Lake Fuehling (Köln, North Rhine-Westphalia)
- Wahnbach Dam (Siegburg, North Rhine-Westphalia)
- Swimming lake Bensheim (Bensheim, Hesse)
- Swimming lake Gernsheim (Gernsheim, Hesse), stopped in 2005
- Auensee (Leipzig, Saxony)
- Lake Runstedt (Braunsbedra, Saxony)
- Bleilochtalsperre (Saale-Orla-Kreis, Thuringia)
- Lake Heide (Forst, Baden-Württemberg)
- Lake Wald (Forst, Baden-Württemberg)
- Open air pool Walldorf (Walldorf, Baden-Württemberg)
- Lake Steinbrunn (Steinbrunn, Austria)
- Brennsee (Villach, Austria)
- Kahrteich (Vienna, Austria)
- Tilgteich (Vienna, Austria)
- Lake Esterhazy (Eisenstadt, Austria)
- Lake Watzelsdorf (Watzelsdorf, Austria)
- Lago di Terlago (Trient, Italy)
- Lazberc Dam (Bánhorváti, Hungary)
- Lagoa das Furnas (Furnas, Portugal)
