= Polymictic lake =

Polymictic lakes are holomictic lakes that are too shallow to develop thermal stratification; thus, their waters can mix from top to bottom throughout the ice-free period. Polymictic lakes can be divided into cold polymictic lakes (i.e., those that are ice-covered in winter), and warm polymictic lakes (i.e., polymictic lakes in regions where ice-cover does not develop in winter). While such lakes are well-mixed on average, during low-wind periods, weak and ephemeral stratification can often develop.

== See also ==
- Amictic lake
- Holomictic lake
- Meromictic lake
- Monomictic lake
- Dimictic lake
- Thermocline
