= Degas conductivity =

Degas conductivity is used as an indicator of water quality in the water/steam cycle of power stations. Excessive conductivity values often indicate high corrosion potential, especially with certain ions such as chloride and acetate ions. These can be particularly damaging to the blades in the steam turbine. Degas conductivity is measured after the water sample has flowed through a resin and has had carbon dioxide removed by a degassing process. Specific conductivity and Cation conductivity are the other main types of measurement.

== Application of conductivity in steam analysis ==
Conductivity measurements in the water/steam cycle of power stations are commonly used as indicators of the quality of the water used in the process. Excessive conductivity values often indicate a high corrosion potential, especially in the case of certain ions such as chloride and acetate ions. These can be particularly damaging to the blades in the steam turbine.

Typically, there are three major types of conductivity measurements used:

- Specific conductivity, a measurement that indicates the total dissolved solids in an aqueous solution
- Cation conductivity, a measurement taken after the water sample has flowed through a resin bed (known as a cation exchanger)
- Degas conductivity, a measurement taken after the water sample has flowed through a resin and has had carbon dioxide removed by a degassing process

Generally, degas conductivity is measured from condensed and cooled samples of primary steam. It may also be relevant for analyzing condensate return, especially in cases where the condensate is returned from a separate plant that used the steam in another process.

Above three conductivity measurement gives one of the most robust measurement. Also with three measurement it is possible to calculate:

(1) pH of condensate/ Steam and Boiler feed water. (Refer VGB-S-010-T-00;2011-12.EN-ebook)

(2) Calculated CO_{2} values (Refer ASTM D4519 Standard)

== Methodology ==
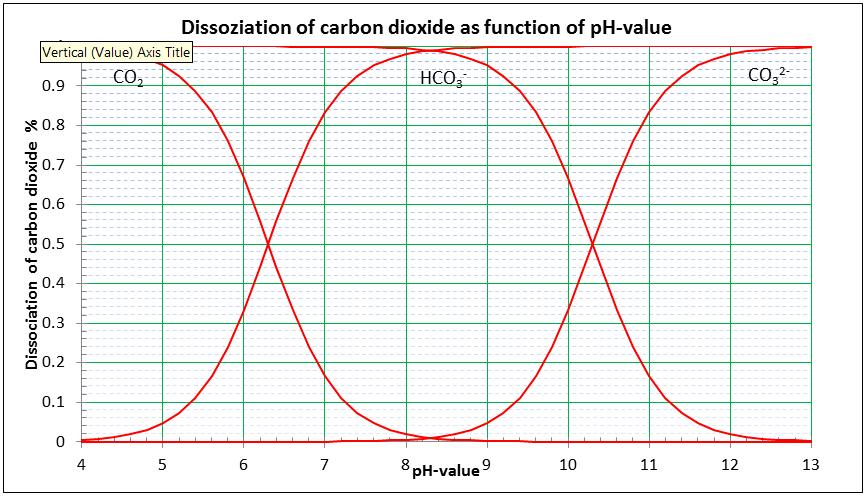

After the ions have been removed from the conditioning of the circulating water (e.g. ammonium NH_{4}^{+}) in the cation exchanger, ions resulting from gaseous components must be removed in order to determine degas conductivity. These are typically gases from the atmosphere which have penetrated into the system through leaks in the water-steam circuit. Of all gases occurring in the atmosphere, typically only carbon dioxide (CO_{2}) dissolves chemically into ions in circulating water. The remaining gases (oxygen, nitrogen, etc.) dissolve physically and do not form ions, and thus do not contribute to conductivity. The chemical reactions of carbon dioxide in water proceed according to the following reaction equation (mass action law):

A) CO_{2} + 2 H_{2}O ↔ HCO_{3} + H_{3}O^{+} pK = 6.3

B) HCO_{3}^{−} + 2 H_{2}O ↔ CO_{3}^{2−} pK = 10.3

See the graph showing relative CO_{2} concentration. After the cation exchanger, the sample pH value is generally 5.5–6, so that means almost only CO_{2} is present as gas, and only about 6% is carbon carbonate ion CO_{3}^{2−}. The bicarbonate ion (HCO_{3}^{−}) is practically absent.

However, ionic components of carbon dioxide are far less dangerous to corrosion than the ions of the saline components, e.g. Cl^{−}. In order to obtain a selective conductivity value for these saline-containing ions (with the maximum potential for corrosion), all remaining carbon dioxide must be removed from the sample in order to accurately determine the presence of corrosive ions.

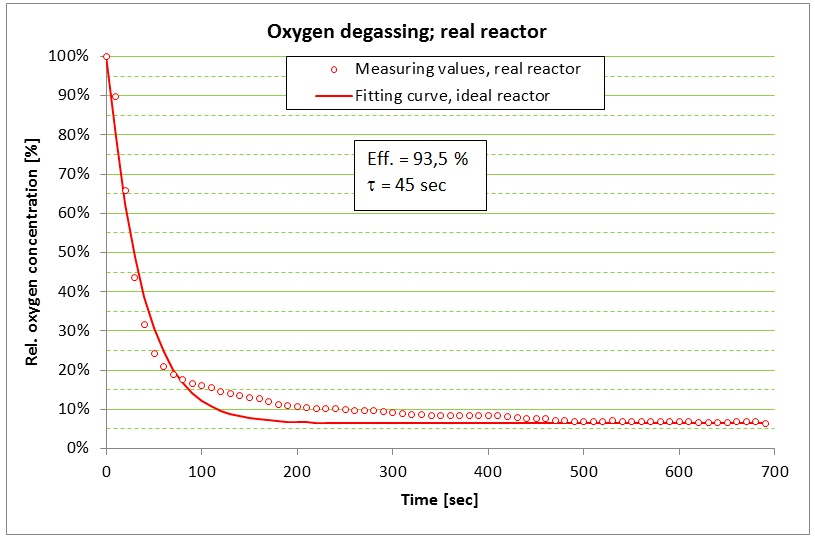

There are generally two methods for removing carbon dioxide from the water sample: use of a reboiler to heat the sample and expel the CO_{2}, and use of inert gasses. In the latter method, an inert gas which does not contain CO_{2} is passed through the sample water, whereby the gas components in the sample water are displaced by the gas components of the inert gas. Use of bottled inert gases can be problematic in some industrial applications. Reboilers are very efficient degassing with results over 92%, but they typically require anywhere from 20 to 45 minutes to achieve useful results. Manufacturers of reboiler systems include Swan Analytical, Forbes Marshall, Mettler Toledo, and Sentry Equipment Corp.

Working of Degas Cation Conductivity system is explained in attached Animation

Some other methods like inert gas method (known as "Gronowski's dynamic method")are also developed, whereby the inert gas is generated in the decarbonation column by passing air through a column filled with soda lime. The removal of the carbon dioxide is carried out in an exchanger column according to the contraflow principle. The inert gas drives the carbon dioxide from the sample water so that no carbonate ion can be formed. What remains in the water sample are salt-like (acid-like) ions and organic components, as well as oxygen and nitrogen which do not form ions in aqueous media. Gronowski's patented degassing method is extremely fast, achieving approximately 94% degassing in 45 seconds, growing up to even greater final efficiency. See the graph, taken from actual test data.

== Reasons for measuring a degassed sample of condensed steam ==
Growth in renewable (but unsteady) energy sources has placed greater burden on modern gas-fired electric plants to cycle on and off to maintain steady and reliable electric production between Renewables and Base Load. These plants utilize a combination of gas (70%) and steam (30%) turbines to produce electricity. Critical for top efficiency is ensuring pure steam reaches the second stage quickly.

During the start up of a power plant, the purity of the generated steam determines whether it can be sent to the steam turbine or if it has to be bypassed to the condenser. Traditionally “Cation Conductivity” instruments are used to analyze steam quality, but in addition to measuring harmful ionic compounds (e.g. chloride ions), they also include CO_{2}, which as stated above is not significantly harmful to the steam turbine. Furthermore, typical cation conductivity analyzers take 3–4 hours to provide useful indications of steam purity. In many cases, this means the plant never reaches 100% efficiency before it cycles offline. That means a gas-turbine combined cycle plant would be burning fuel at 100%, but only achieving a 70% output and venting the excess heat and exhaust.

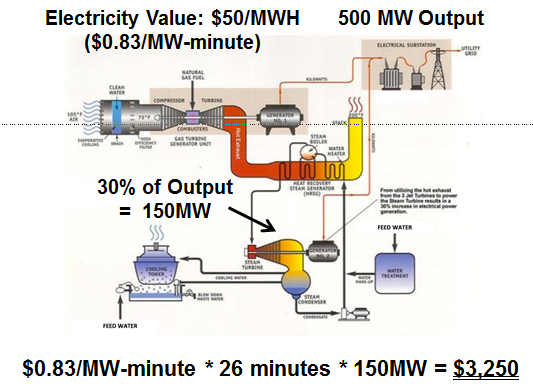
Compared savings from dynamic degassing over reboiler degassing

In the case of a traditional base load power plant, cycling is much less frequent—in some cases, only twice annually for maintenance. Compared with measuring only cation conductivity, the cost savings from an accelerated start-up using degas conductivity is potentially very large. At $0.50/MW-minute ($30/MWH), a 750MW coal plant starting three hours faster each cycle could theoretically generate an additional $133,875 of annual revenue from the same fuel.

Based on similar assumptions, the cost savings between different degassing methodologies is significant. If a dynamic system similar to Gronowski's is used, in the nearly 30 minutes of start-up time saved over a reboiler method, the typical combined cycle plant will generate even more income from the same fuel consumed with each and every system start, especially using typical “peak” electricity pricing. Additional benefits are better energy efficiency and reduced emissions of heat and exhaust.

Degas Cation conductivity instruments are designed for measurement of all three conductivity Values (Specific, Cation and Degas Cation Conductivity) and also provides output for calculated pH and calculated CO_{2} in Feed water or Condensate.
