= Prashar Lake =

Lake in Himachal Pradesh, India

Parashar Lake
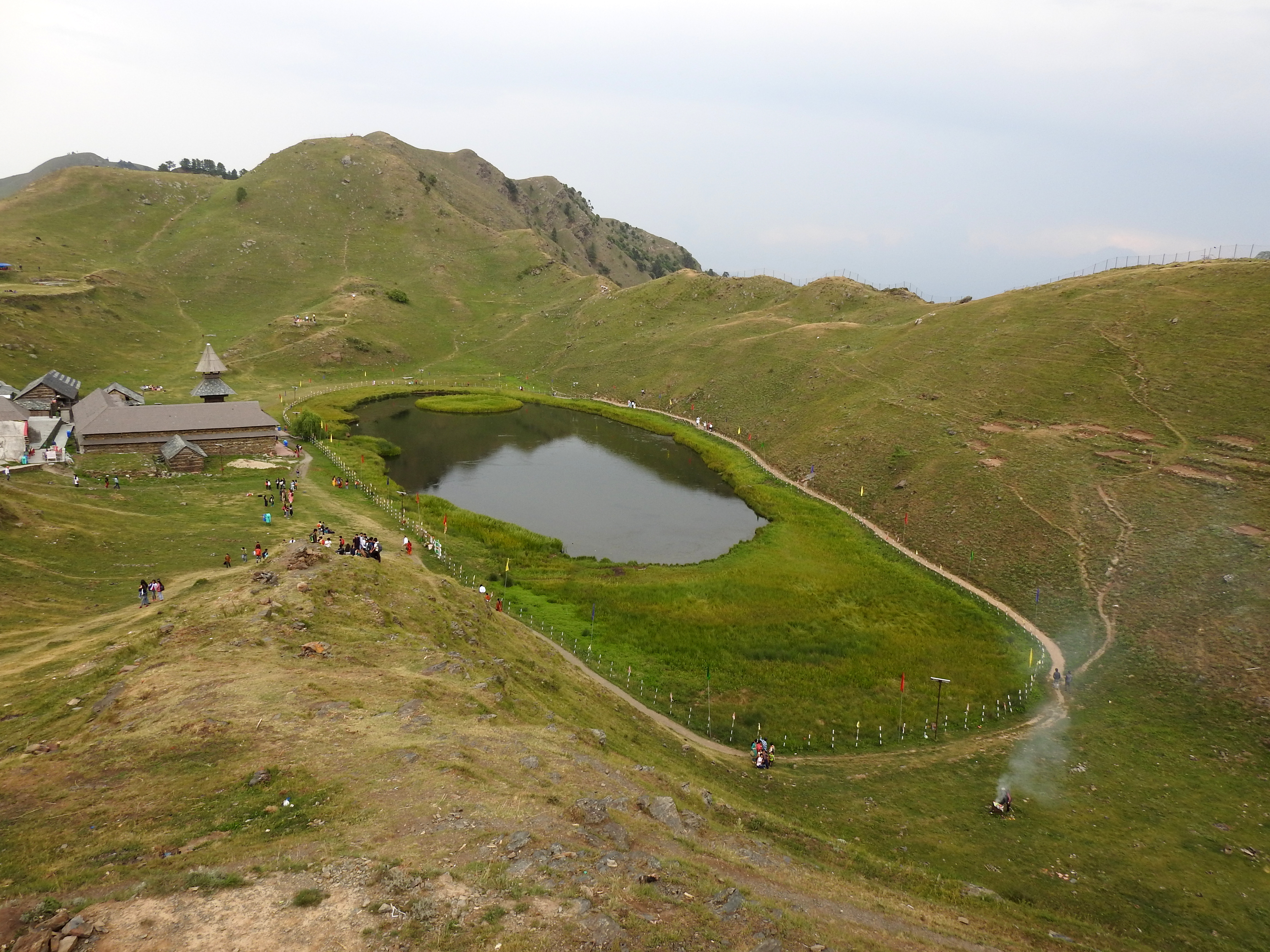
- Parashar Lake

- Location within Himachal Pradesh Location within India
- Location: Mandi district
- Coordinates: 31.75426°N 77.10141°E
- Type: Holomictic
- Primary inflows: Rain water
- Primary outflows: Evaporation
- Basin countries: India
- Surface area: 1 ha (2.5 acres)
- Surface elevation: 2,730 m (8,960 ft)
- References: www.hptdc.gov.in

Parashar Lake is a freshwater lake located at an elevation of 2,730 metres (8,960 ft) in the Mandi district of Himachal Pradesh, India. It lies 12 km (7.5 mi) north of the town of Mandi, and has a three storied pagoda-like temple dedicated to the sage Parashara situated on its bank. It contains a floating island.

== History ==
Maharishi Parashar Ji

“Parashṛṇāti pāpānīti Parāśaraḥ” — meaning, the one whose mere sight and remembrance destroys all sins is Parāśara. Maharishi Parashar was a descendant of Lord Brahma and the grandson of Maharishi Vashishtha. He was born in the Treta Yuga to Mata Adrushyanti. His father was Shakti Muni, and his son was Maharishi Ved Vyasa, the revered sage traditionally regarded as the author of the Mahabharata.

Maharishi Parashar was a Mantra-drashta (seer of Vedic mantras), scholar of the scriptures, knower of Brahman, Smritikara, and the progenitor of a lineage (gotra). He was also a seer of Vedic hymns and an author of numerous works. He is traditionally associated with the revelation and composition of knowledge concerning Dharma Shastra, Jyotisha (astrology), Vastu Shastra, Ayurveda, and Niti Shastra (ethics and statecraft). Works attributed to him include Brihat Parashara Hora Shastra, Laghu Parashari, Brihat Parashariya Dharma Samhita, Parashara Dharma Samhita, Parasharoditam, Vastu Shastram, Parashara Samhita (Ayurveda), Vishnu Purana, Parashara Mahapurana, and Parashara Niti Shastra, among others, which are regarded in tradition as works intended for the welfare of humanity.

According to local tradition, Maharishi Parashar came to the lake for the purpose of composing scriptures and performing penance, and sanctified this region through his spiritual power for a long period. Situated amidst the towering ranges of the Dhauladhar, this sacred site associated with Maharishi Parashar is a centre of faith for a vast region. Surrounded by mountains, the lake has for centuries remained a mystery for travellers and researchers because of its beauty and unknown depth.

The principal attraction of the lake is its floating island, which is believed to continuously move from one side of the lake to another in a mysterious manner. Beside the lake stands the temple of Maharishi Parashar, built in the pagoda style. According to tradition, the temple was commissioned in the 14th century by King Ban Sen, the founder of the Mandi princely state. The intricate carvings on the exterior and pillars of the temple are remarkable examples of the craftsmanship of the region during that period. The carvings depict deities, serpents, trees, plants, flowers, creepers, animals, and birds.

The temple remains open throughout the year. In accordance with local tradition, devotees receive prasad and Shesh (flower) of Maharishi Parashar, which is regarded as a sacred blessing and is respectfully kept by devotees.

Grand fairs and religious festivals are held throughout the year at this sacred site, reflecting its extensive regional influence and deep religious connections. Among the principal festivals celebrated here are Kashi, Rishi Panchami, and Sauranahuli. During these festivals, various deities from the valleys of Shanor, Badar, Utrasaal, and Saraj participate in the celebrations at Parashar, bringing different regional traditions and cultures closer together.

The sacred land of Maharishi Parashar, locally known as Saur, is also visited by Devraths (sacred processional representations of local deities) from surrounding valleys during periods of drought or for ritual bathing and other religious purposes.

The Main Bhandar of Maharishi Parashar

The main Bhandar (sacred repository) of Maharishi Parashar Ji is located in the village of Bandhi, a few kilometres from the Parashar sacred site.

In the local religious traditions of Himachal Pradesh, almost every deity is represented by a Devrath. However, Maharishi Parashar Ji does not have a Devrath. Except during Rishi Panchami and Kashi Parv, when Maharishi Parashar appears in the form of Khara and travels from the Bhandar at Bandhi to the Parashar sacred site, Maharishi Parashar is traditionally represented in the form of a Chhari (sacred staff) for devotees.

Maharishi Parashar is also lovingly and reverentially known throughout the region as “Dadu”, meaning the eldest or most senior deity.

Although Maharishi Parashar is revered throughout the Sanatana tradition for his profound contribution to spiritual and scriptural knowledge, the devotion and faith associated with him in the Mandi–Kullu region of Himachal Pradesh are particularly distinctive.

Maharishi Parashar Ji is regarded as the Kul Devta (family/lineage deity) of the Mandi royal family and is revered across the former princely state’s Shanor, Badar, Utrasaal, and Saraj valleys, as well as by the Waziriyah of Lag Maharaj in Kullu district.

Although these regions are geographically distinct, they share a remarkably close cultural relationship, and the devotion to Maharishi Parashar has played an important role in maintaining these connections. Thus, Dadu Maharishi Parashar, as a centre of faith for people across these different regions, continues to bind diverse communities and traditions together through a shared cultural and spiritual heritage.

== Details ==
The lake is located at an elevation of 2,730 m (8,960 ft) above sea level. With deep blue waters, the lake is held sacred to the sage Parashar and he is regarded to have meditated there. Surrounded by snow-capped peaks and looking down on the fast flowing river Beas, the lake can be approached from Mandi or from Bajaura in Kullu Valley. Both routes are 49 km (30 mi). There is a round, floating island in the lake, which is a common natural phenomenon found all around the world. It is composed of plant matter in various stages of decomposition, and is held afloat by the oxygen in its plants' roots. The floating island moves in all directions in the lake. The floating island covers 7% of the area of the lake.

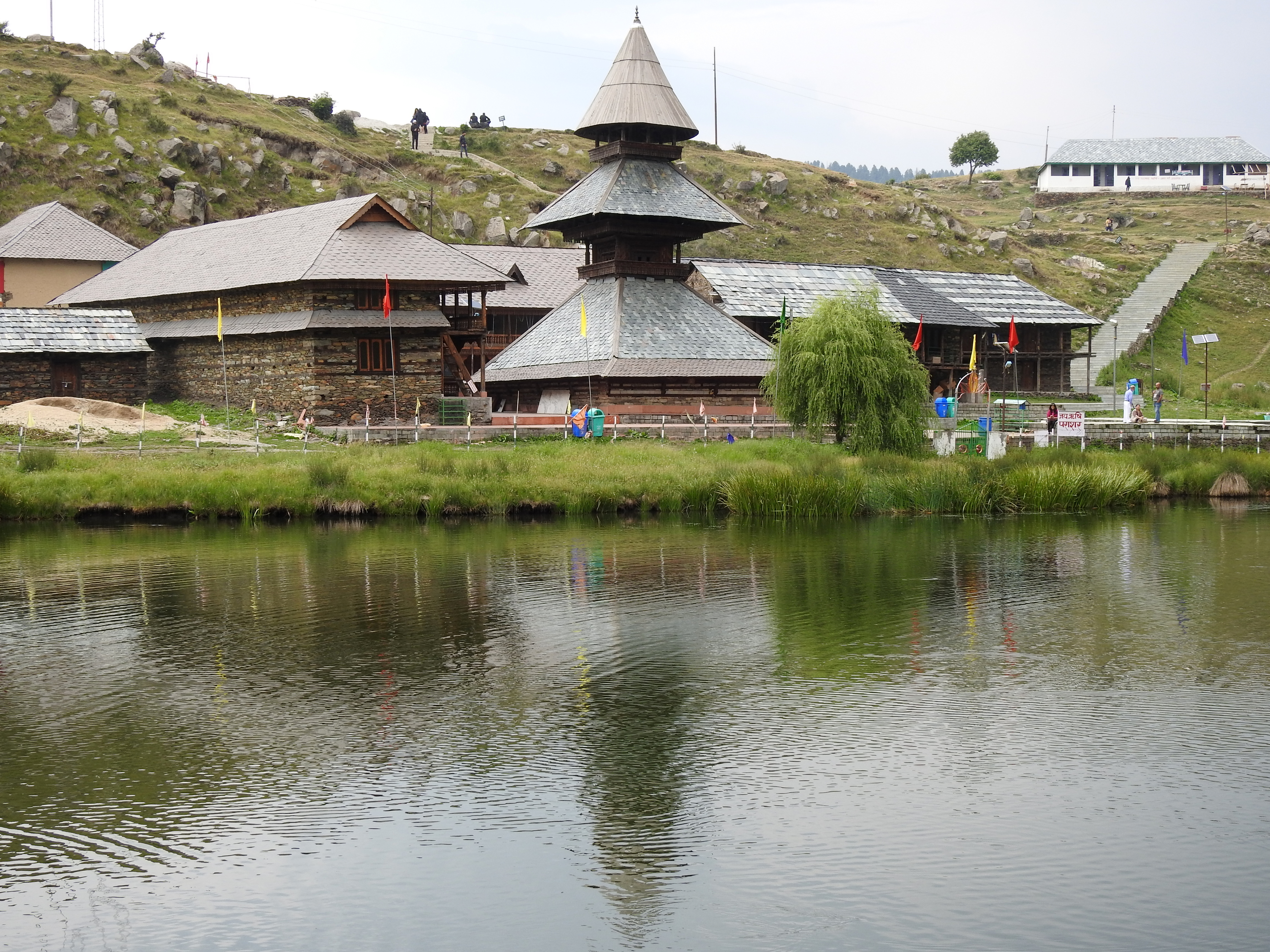
Temple view, Prashar Lake

The temple was built in the thirteenth century and legend has it was built by a baby from a single tree. Until now no one has determined the depth of Prashar Lake. It is said that a diver is not able to determine its depth.

== Mythology ==
It is believed that Sage Prashar meditated on the banks of this lake, hence it is named Prashar Lake.

== Geography ==
Prashar Lake is approximately 49 km (30 mi) by road from the town of Mandi. The maximum depth of the lake remains unknown.

== Gallery ==
=== Views of Prashar Lake, Temple and surroundings ===
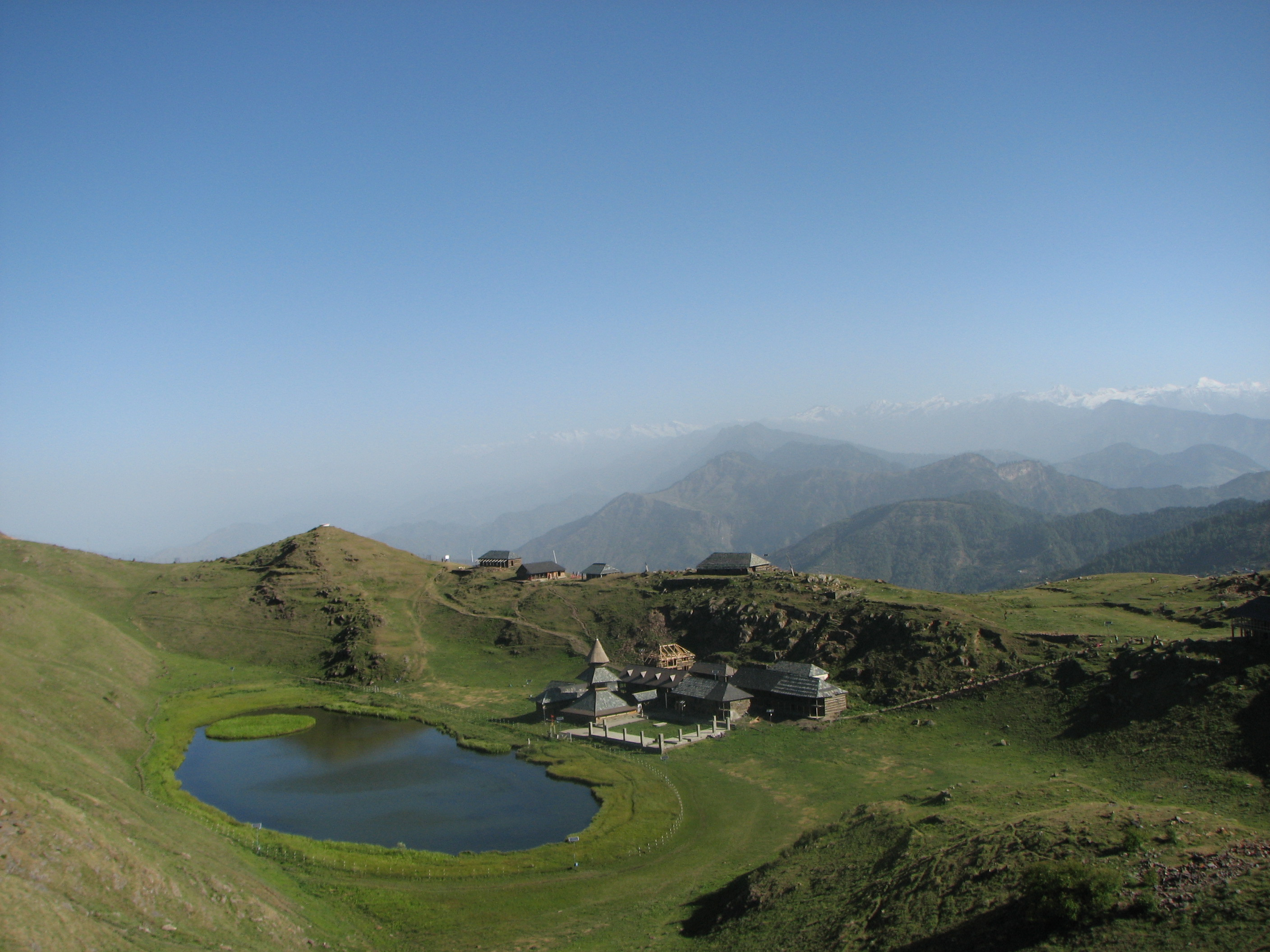
Prashar Lake and temple, Jan '21

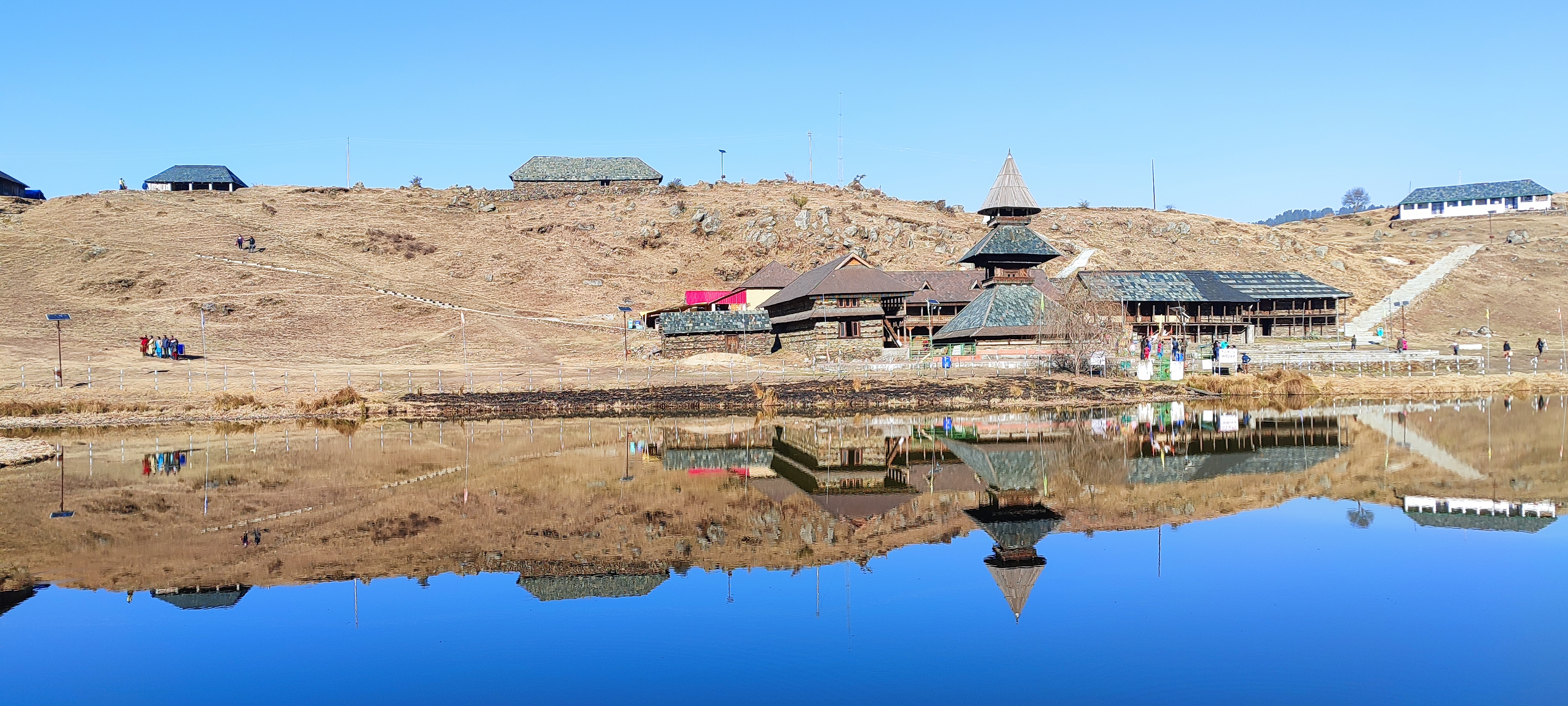
Dry winter view of Prashar Lake and temple

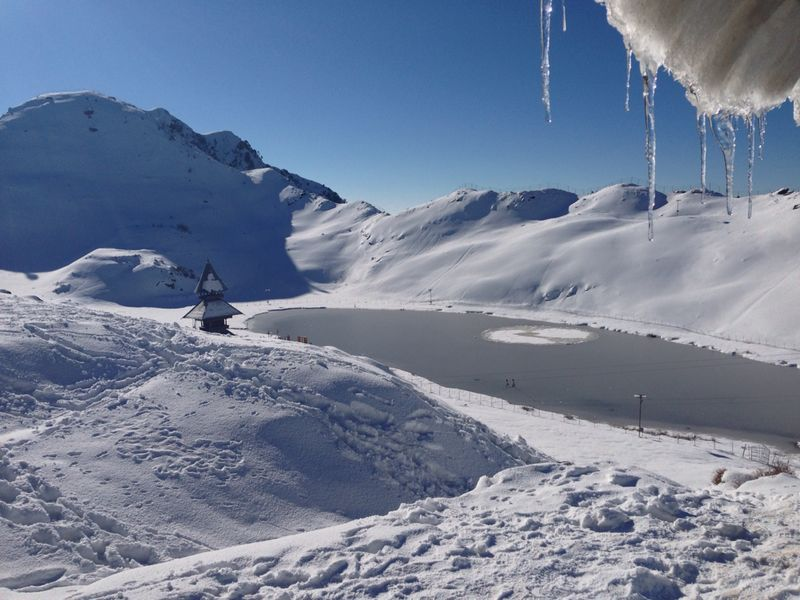
Prashar Lake frozen and snow-covered, Feb '14.

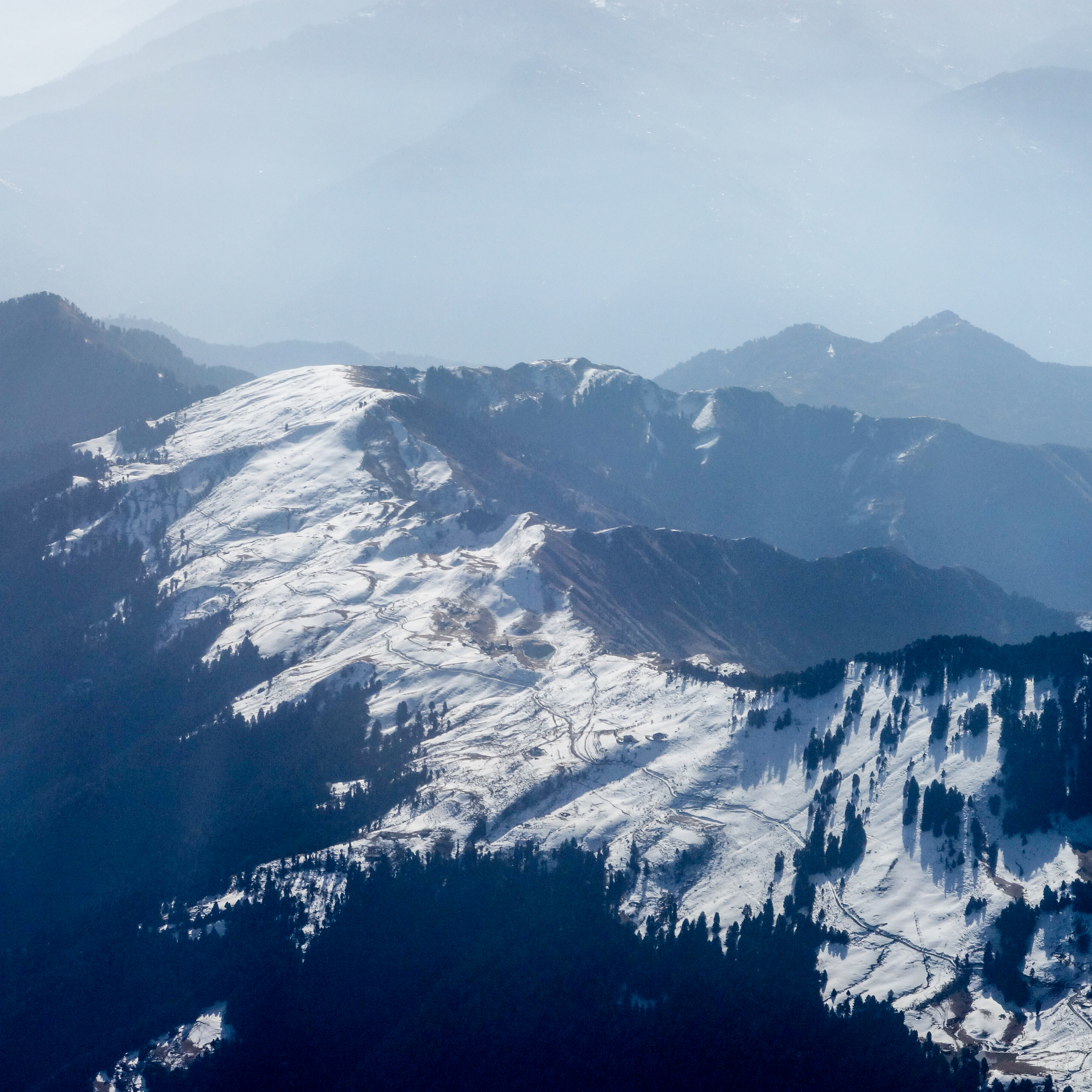
Aerial view, lake in centre, approach road from lower right corner, Feb '18

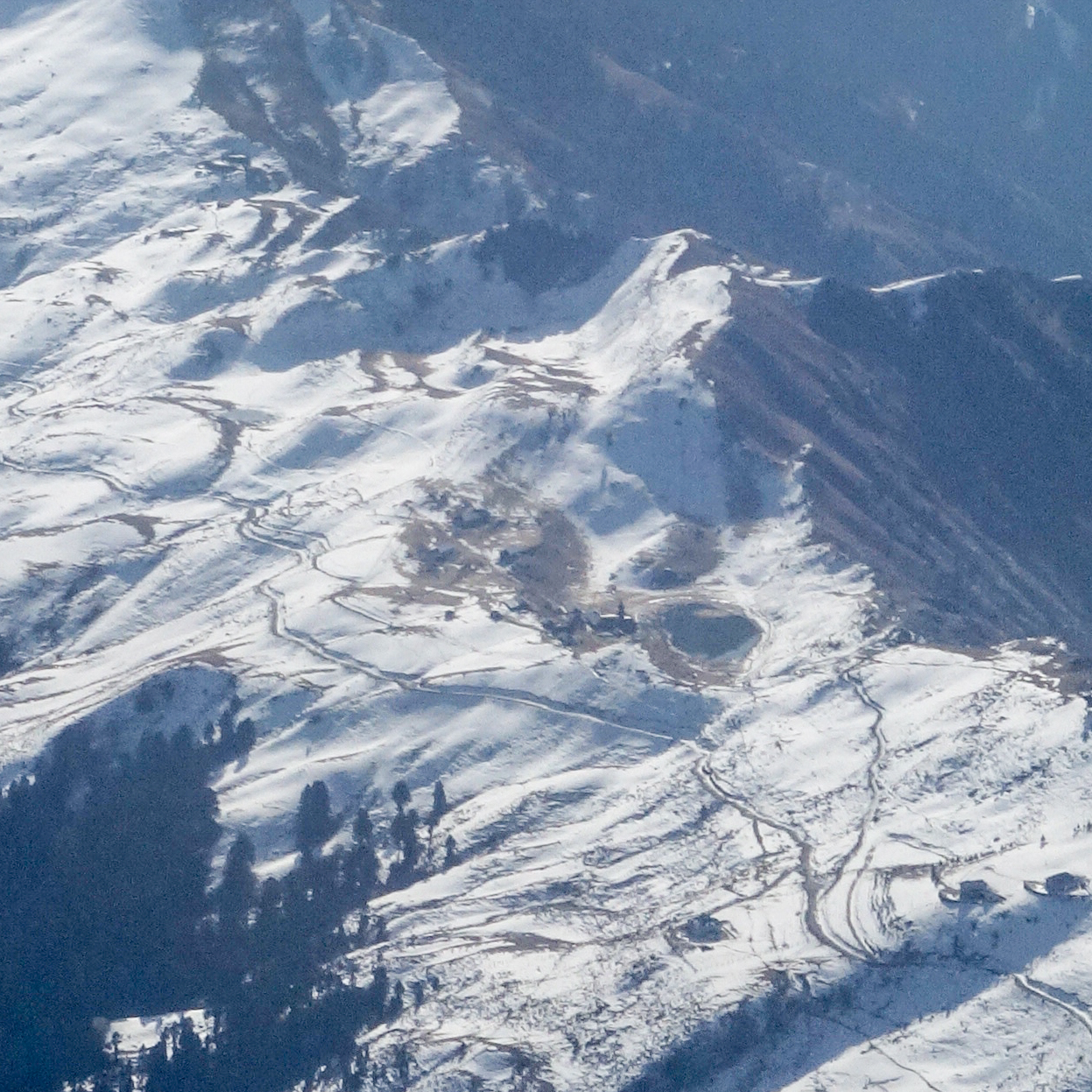
Aerial view, lake and temple in centre, Feb '18

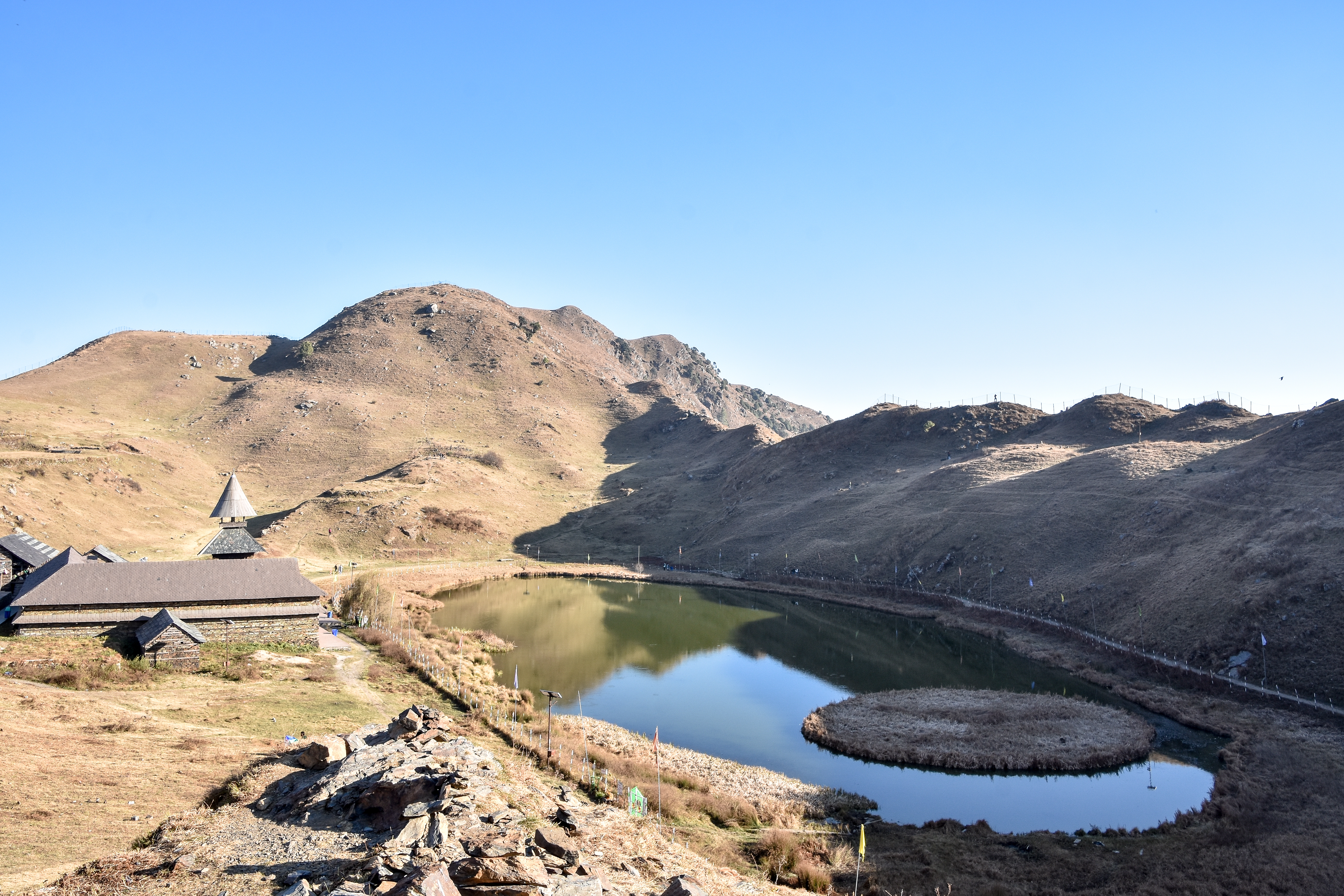
Prashar Lake and temple, Nov. '20

=== Flora of Prashar Lake ===
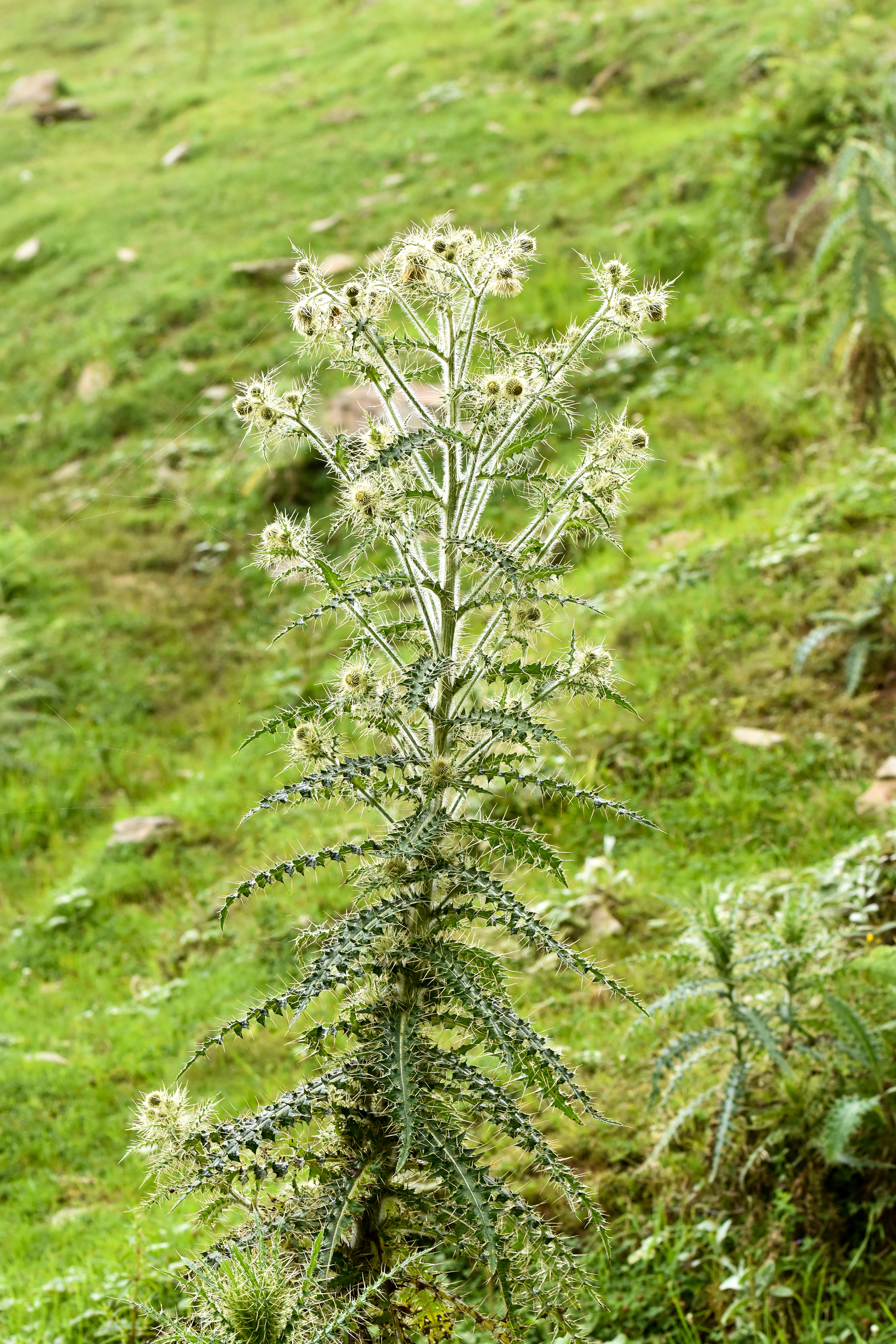
Thistle plant (Cirsium wallichii)

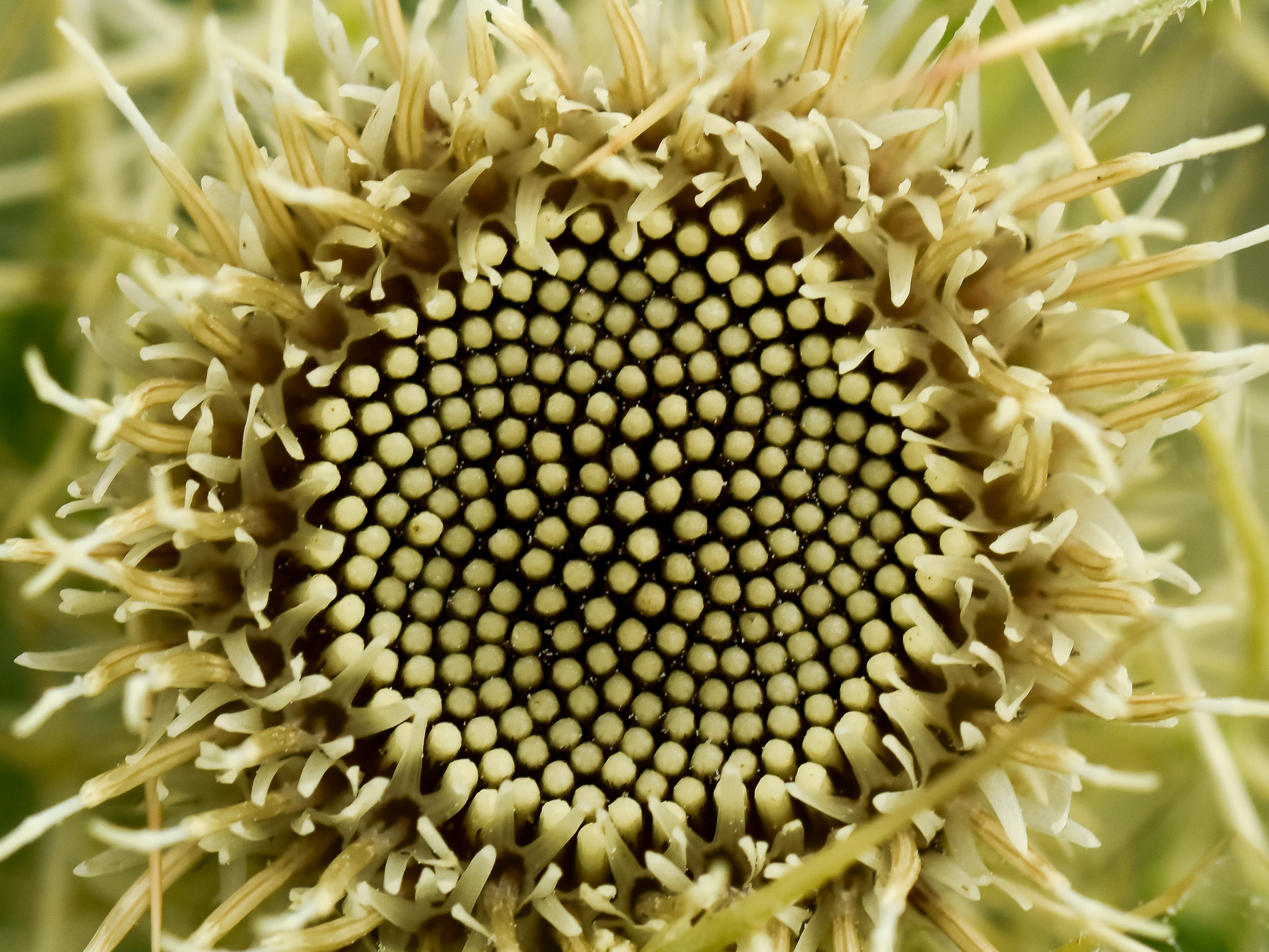
Florets of Thistle (Cirsium wallichii)
