= Degassing =

Removal of dissolved gases from liquids

Degassing, also known as degasification, is the removal of dissolved gases from liquids, especially water or aqueous solutions. There are numerous methods for removing gases from liquids.

Gases are removed for various reasons. Chemists remove gases from solvents when the compounds they are working on are possibly air- or oxygen-sensitive (air-free technique), or when bubble formation at solid-liquid interfaces becomes a problem. The formation of gas bubbles when a liquid is frozen can also be undesirable, necessitating degassing beforehand.

== Pressure reduction ==
The solubility of gas obeys Henry's law, that is, the amount of a dissolved gas in a liquid is proportional to its partial pressure. Therefore, placing a solution under reduced pressure makes the dissolved gas less soluble. Sonication and stirring under reduced pressure can usually enhance the efficiency. This technique is often referred to as vacuum degasification. Specialized vacuum chambers, called vacuum degassers, are used to degas materials through pressure reduction.

== Thermal regulation ==
Generally speaking, an aqueous solvent dissolves less gas at higher temperature, and vice versa for organic solvents (provided the solute and solvent do not react). Consequently, heating an aqueous solution can expel dissolved gas, whereas cooling an organic solution has the same effect. Ultrasonication and stirring during thermal regulation are also effective. This method needs no special apparatus and is easy to conduct. In some cases, however, the solvent and the solute decompose, react with each other, or evaporate at high temperature, and the rate of removal is less reproducible.

== Membrane degasification ==
Gas-liquid separation membranes allow gas but not liquid to pass through. Flowing a solution inside a gas-liquid separation membrane and evacuating outside makes the dissolved gas go out through the membrane. This method has the advantage of being able to prevent redissolution of the gas, so it is used to produce very pure solvents. New applications are in inkjet systems where gas in the ink forms bubbles that degrade print quality, a degassing unit is placed prior to the print head to remove gas and prevent the buildup of bubbles keeping good jetting and print quality.

The above three methods are used to remove all dissolved gases. Below are methods for more selective removal.

== Ultrasonic degassing ==
Ultrasonic liquid processors are a commonly used method for removing dissolved gasses and/or entrained gas bubbles from various of liquids. The advantage of this method is that that ultrasonic degassing can be done in a continuous-flow mode, which makes it suitable for commercial-scale production.

== Sparging by inert gas ==
Bubbling a solution with a high-purity (typically inert) gas can pull out undesired (typically reactive) dissolved gases such as oxygen and carbon dioxide. Nitrogen, argon, helium and other inert gases are commonly used. To maximize this process called sparging, the solution is stirred vigorously and bubbled for a long time. Because helium is not very soluble in most liquids, it is particularly useful to reduce the risk of bubbles in high-performance liquid chromatography (HPLC) systems.

== Addition of reductant ==
If oxygen should be removed, the addition of reductants is sometimes effective. For example, especially in the field of electrochemistry, ammonium sulfite is frequently used as a reductant because it reacts with oxygen to form sulfate ions. Although this method can be applied only to oxygen and involves the risk of reduction of the solute, the dissolved oxygen is almost totally eliminated. The ketyl radical from sodium and benzophenone can also be used for removing both oxygen and water from inert solvents such as hydrocarbons and ethers; the degassed solvent can be separated by distillation. The latter method is particularly useful because a high concentration of ketyl radical generates a deep blue colour, indicating the solvent is fully degassed.

== Freeze-pump-thaw cycling ==
In this laboratory-scale technique, the fluid to be degassed is placed in a Schlenk flask and flash-frozen, usually with liquid nitrogen. Next a vacuum is applied, perhaps to attain a vacuum of 1 mm Hg (for illustrative purposes). The flask is sealed from the vacuum source, and the frozen solvent is allowed to thaw. Often, bubbles appears upon melting. The process is typically repeated a total of three cycles. The degree of degassing is expressed by the equation (1/760)^{3} for the case of initial pressure being 760 mm Hg, the vacuum being 1 mm Hg, and the total number of cycles being three.

== Degassing wine ==
Yeast uses sugar to produce alcohol and carbon dioxide. In winemaking, carbon dioxide is an undesired by-product for most wines. If the wine is bottled quickly after fermentation, it is important to degas the wine before bottling.

Wineries can skip the degassing process if they age their wines prior to bottling. Storing the wines in steel or oak barrels for months and sometimes years allows gases to be released from the wine and escape into the air through air-locks.

== Oil degassing ==
The most efficient method of industrial oil degassing is vacuum processing, which removes air and water solved in the oil. This can be achieved by:

- spraying of oil in large vacuum chambers;
- distributing the oil into a thin layer over special surfaces (spiral rings, Raschig rings etc) in vacuum chambers.

Under vacuum, an equilibrium between the content of moisture and air (solved gases) in the liquid and gaseous phase is achieved. The equilibrium depends on the temperature and the residual pressure. The lower that pressure, the faster and more efficiently are water and gas removed.

== Unintended degassing ==
Unintended degassing can happen for various reasons, such as accidental release of methane ( CH_{4} ) from the seabed during human activity such as underwater exploration by the energy industry. Natural processes such as tectonic plate movement can also contribute to methane release from the ocean floor. In both cases, the volume of CH_{4} released can be a significant contributor to climate change.

== See also ==
- Degas conductivity
- Degassed water
- Limnic eruption
- Outgassing (includes geological and volcanic emissions)
- Volcanic gas
- Polymer devolatilization
