= Hypolimnion =

Bottom layer of water in a thermally-stratified lake

Lakes are stratified into three separate sections: I. The Epilimnion II. The Metalimnion III. The Hypolimnion The scales are used to associate each section of the stratification to their corresponding depths and temperatures. The arrow is used to show the movement of wind over the surface of the water which initiates the turnover in the epilimnion and the hypolimnion.

The hypolimnion or under lake is the dense, bottom layer of water in a thermally-stratified lake. The word "hypolimnion" is derived from Ancient Greek: λιμνίον, romanized: limníon, lit. 'lake'. It is the layer that lies below the thermocline.

Typically the hypolimnion is the coldest layer of a lake in summer, and the warmest layer during winter. In deep, temperate lakes, the bottom-most waters of the hypolimnion are typically close to 4 °C throughout the year. The hypolimnion may be much warmer in lakes at warmer latitudes. Being at depth, it is isolated from surface wind-mixing during summer, and usually receives insufficient irradiance (light) for photosynthesis to occur.

== Oxygen dynamics ==
The deepest portions of the hypolimnion often have lower oxygen concentrations than the surface waters (i.e., epilimnion). While oxygen can typically exchange between surface waters and the atmosphere (i.e., in the absence of ice cover), bottom waters are comparatively isolated from atmospheric replenishment of oxygen. In particular, during periods of thermal stratification, gas exchange between the epilimnion and hypolimnion is limited by the density difference between these two layers. Consequently, decomposition of organic matter in the water column and sediments can cause oxygen concentrations to decline to the point of hypoxia (low oxygen) or anoxia (no oxygen). In dimictic, eutrophic lakes, the hypolimnion is often anoxic throughout a majority of the stratified period. However, hypolimnetic oxygen concentrations are replenished in the fall and early winter in many temperate lakes, as lake turnover allows mixing of oxic surface waters and anoxic bottom waters.

Notably, anoxic conditions in temperate lakes have the potential to create a positive feedback, whereby anoxia during a given year begets increasingly severe and frequent occurrences of anoxia in future years. Anoxia can lead to release of nutrients from sediment, which contribute to increased phytoplankton growth. Increased phytoplankton growth subsequently increases decomposition, perpetuating hypolimnetic oxygen declines. This positive feedback effect has been termed the Anoxia Begets Anoxia feedback.

=== Hypolimnetic aeration ===
In eutrophic lakes where the hypolimnion is anoxic, hypolimnetic aeration may be used to add oxygen to the hypolimnion. Adding oxygen to the system through aeration can be costly because it requires significant amounts of energy.

== See also ==
- Epilimnion
- Metalimnion
