= Degassed water =

Water subjected to a degassing process

Degassed water is water subjected to a process of degassing, which essentially consists in the removal of gas dissolved in the liquid.

This may be done for several reasons. For example, when water is used as a solvent in an experiment involves compounds that are potentially air- or oxygen-sensitive, or when bubble formation in any state of the fluid is a potential issue, it is desirable to degas the water first. Many hydrophobic or not-readily-soluble substances such as hydrocarbons, silicones, and natural oils are more readily dispersed as fine droplets when water is degassed.

== See also ==
- Degassing
