= Lake stratification =

Separation of water in a lake into distinct layers

Lakes are stratified into three separate sections: I. The Epilimnion II. The Metalimnion III. The Hypolimnion The scales are used to associate each section of the stratification to their corresponding depths and temperatures. The arrow is used to show the movement of wind over the surface of the water which initiates the turnover in the epilimnion and the hypolimnion.

Lake stratification is the tendency of lakes to form separate and distinct thermal layers during warm weather. Typically stratified lakes show three distinct layers: the epilimnion, comprising the top warm layer; the thermocline (or metalimnion), the middle layer, whose depth may change throughout the day; and the colder hypolimnion, extending to the floor of the lake.

Every lake has a set mixing regime that is influenced by lake morphometry and environmental conditions. However, changes to human influences in the form of land use change, increases in temperature, and changes to weather patterns have been shown to alter the timing and intensity of stratification in lakes around the globe. Rising air temperatures have the same effect on lake bodies as a physical shift in geographic location, with tropical zones being particularly sensitive. These changes can further alter the fish, zooplankton, and phytoplankton community composition, in addition to creating gradients that alter the availability of dissolved oxygen and nutrients.

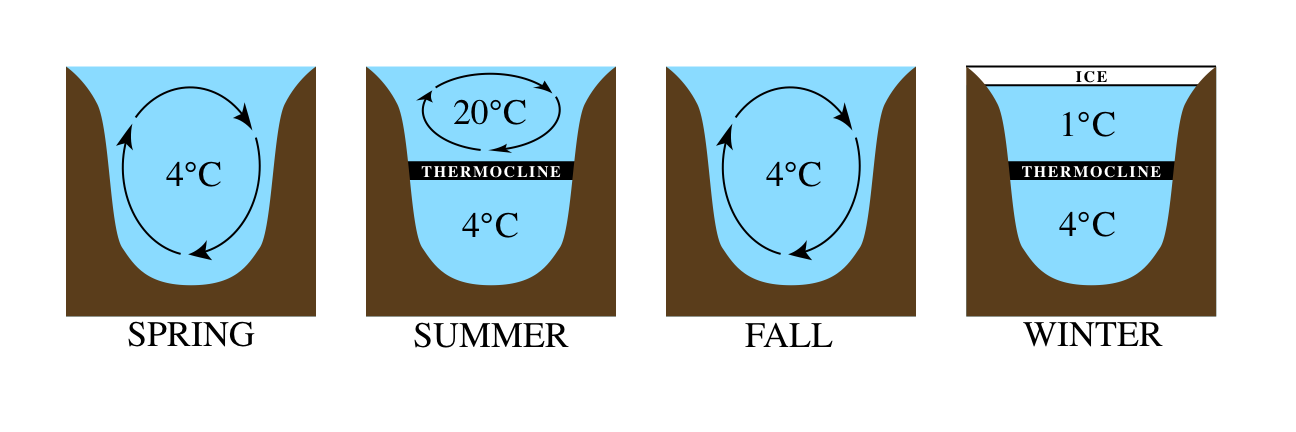
Typical mixing pattern for many lakes, caused by the fact that water is less dense at temperatures other than 4 °C or 39 °F (the temperature where water is most dense). Lake stratification is stable in summer and winter, becoming unstable in spring and fall when the surface waters cross the 4 °C mark.

== Definition ==
The thermal stratification of lakes refers to a change in the temperature at different depths in the lake, and is due to the density of water varying with temperature. Cold water is denser than warm water, and the epilimnion generally consists of water that is not as dense as the water in the hypolimnion. The temperature of maximum density for fresh water is 4 °C (39 °F). In temperate regions where lake water warms up and cools through the seasons, a cyclical pattern of overturn occurs that is repeated from year to year as the cold dense water at the top of the lake sinks (see stable and unstable stratification). For example, in dimictic lakes the lake water turns over during the spring and the fall. This process occurs more slowly in deeper water; as a result, a thermal bar may form. If the stratification of water lasts for extended periods, the lake is meromictic.

Heat is transported very slowly between the mixed layers of a stratified lake: the diffusion of heat just one vertical meter takes about a month. The interaction between the atmosphere and lakes depends on how solar radiation is distributed, which is why water turbulence, mainly caused by wind stress, can greatly increase the efficiency of heat transfer. In shallow lakes, stratification into epilimnion, metalimnion, and hypolimnion often does not occur, as wind or cooling causes regular mixing throughout the year. These lakes are called polymictic. There is not a fixed depth that differentiates polymictic and stratifying lakes, as this is also influenced by turbidity, lake surface area, and climate.

The lake mixing regime (e.g. polymictic, dimictic, meromictic) describes the yearly patterns of lake stratification that occur in most years. However, short-term events can influence lake stratification as well. Heat waves can cause periods of stratification in otherwise mixed, shallow lakes, while mixing events, such as storms or large river discharge, can break down stratification. Weather conditions induce a more rapid response in larger, shallower lakes, so these lakes are more dynamic and less well understood. However, mixing regimes that are known to exist in large, shallow lakes are mostly diurnal, and the stratification is easily disturbed. Lake Taihu in China is an example of a large, shallow, diurnal lake, where even though the depth does not reach more than 3 meters (10 ft), the lake's water turbidity is still dynamic enough to stratify and de-stratify due to the absorption of solar radiation, mostly in the upper layer. The tendency for stratification to become disrupted affects the rate of transport and consumption of nutrients, in turn affecting the presence of algal growth. Stratification and mixing regimes in Earth's largest lakes are also poorly understood, yet changes in thermal distributions, such as the rising temperatures found over time in Lake Michigan's deep waters, can significantly alter the largest freshwater ecosystems on the planet.

Recent research suggests that seasonally ice-covered dimictic lakes may be described as "cryostratified" or "cryomictic" according to their wintertime stratification regimes. Cryostratified lakes exhibit inverse stratification near the ice surface, and have depth-averaged temperatures near 4 °C, while cryomictic lakes have no under-ice thermocline and have depth-averaged winter temperatures closer to 0 °C.

Water circulation during mixing periods causes the movement of oxygen and other dissolved nutrients, distributing them throughout the body of water. In lakes where benthic organisms are prominent, the respiration and consumption of these bottom-feeders may outweigh the mixing properties of strongly stratified lakes, resulting in zones of extremely low near-bottom oxygen and nutrient concentrations. This can be harmful to benthic organisms such as shellfish; in the worst cases it can wipe out entire populations. The accumulation of dissolved carbon dioxide (CO_{2}) in three meromictic lakes in Africa (Lake Nyos and Lake Monoun in Cameroon and Lake Kivu in Rwanda) is potentially dangerous, because if one of these lakes is triggered into limnic eruption, a very large quantity of CO_{2} can quickly leave the lake and displace the oxygen needed for life by people and animals in the surrounding area.

== De-stratification ==
In temperate latitudes, many lakes that become stratified during the summer months de-stratify during cooler windier weather, with surface mixing by wind being a significant driver in this process. This is often referred to as "autumn turn-over". The mixing of the hypolimnium into the mixed water body of the lake recirculates nutrients, particularly phosphorus compounds, trapped in the hypolimnion during the warm weather. It also poses a risk of oxygen sag as a long established hypolimnion can be anoxic or very low in oxygen.

Lake mixing regimes can shift in response to increasing air temperatures. These can turn some dimictic lakes into monomictic lakes, while some monomictic lakes might become meromictic.

Many types of aeration equipment have been used to thermally de-stratify lakes, particularly lakes subject to low oxygen or undesirable algal blooms. Natural resource and environmental managers are often challenged by problems caused by lake and pond thermal stratification. Fish die-offs have been directly associated with thermal gradients, stagnation, and ice cover. Excessive growth of plankton may limit the recreational use of lakes and the commercial use of lake water. Severe thermal stratification in a lake can also adversely affect the quality of drinking water. The spatial distribution of fish within a lake is often adversely affected by thermal stratification, and in some cases may indirectly cause large die-offs of recreationally important fish. One commonly used tool to mitigate these lake management problems is to eliminate or lessen thermal stratification through water aeration. Aeration has met with some success, although it has rarely proved to be a panacea.

== Anthropogenic influences ==
Every lake has a set mixing regime that is influenced by lake morphometry and environmental conditions. However, changes to human influences in the form of land use change, increases in temperatures, and changes to weather patterns have been shown to alter the timing and intensity of stratification in lakes around the globe. These changes can further alter the fish, zooplankton, and phytoplankton community composition, in addition to creating gradients that alter the availability of dissolved oxygen and nutrients.

Local land use

There are a number of ways in which changes in human land use influence lake stratification and consequently water conditions. Urban expansion has led to the construction of roads and houses close to previously isolated lakes, sometimes causing increased runoff and pollution. The addition of particulate matter to lake bodies can lower water clarity, resulting in stronger thermal stratification and overall lower average water column temperatures, which can eventually affect the onset of ice cover. Water quality can also be influenced by the runoff of salt from roads and sidewalks, which often creates a benthic saline layer that interferes with vertical mixing of surface waters. Further, the saline layer can prevent dissolved oxygen from reaching the bottom sediments, decreasing phosphorus recycling and affecting microbial communities.

Global rising temperatures

On a global scale, rising temperatures and changing weather patterns can also affect stratification in lakes. Rising air temperature has the same effect on lake bodies as a physical shift in geographic location, with tropical zones being particularly sensitive. The intensity and scope of impact depend on location and lake morphometry, but in some cases can be so extreme as to require a reclassification from monomictic to dimictic (e.g. Great Bear Lake). Globally, lake stratification appears to be more stable with deeper and steeper thermoclines, and average lake temperature as a main determinant in the stratification response to changing temperatures. Further, surface warming rates are much greater than bottom warming rates, again indicating stronger thermal stratification across lakes.

Changes to stratification patterns can also alter the community composition of lake ecosystems. In shallow lakes, temperature increases can alter the diatom community; while in deep lakes, the change is reflected in the deep chlorophyll layer taxa. Changes in mixing patterns and increased nutrient availability can also affect zooplankton species composition and abundance, while decreased nutrient availability can be detrimental to benthic communities and fish habitat.

In northern temperate lakes, as climate change continues to cause increased variability in weather patterns as well as in the timing of ice-on and ice-off dates, subsequent changes in stratification patterns from year to year can also affect multiple trophic levels. Fluctuations in stratification consistency can accelerate deoxygenation of lakes, nutrient mineralization, and phosphorus release, with significant consequences for phytoplankton species. Furthermore, these changes in phytoplankton species composition and abundance can affect fish recruitment, such as walleye. When these asynchronies in predator and prey populations occur year after year due to changes in stratification, populations may take years to rebound to their "normal" consistency. Combined with typically warmer lake temperatures associated with stratification patterns brought on by climate change, variable prey populations from year-to-year can be detrimental to cold water fish species.

== See also ==
- Aquatic Science
- Stratification (water)
- Hypoxia
- Freshwater ecosystems
- Water column
- Lake aeration
