= Asphyxiant gas =

Nontoxic or minimally toxic gas which can displace oxygen in breathing air

An asphyxiant gas, also known as a simple asphyxiant, is a nontoxic or minimally toxic gas which reduces or displaces the normal oxygen concentration in breathing air. Breathing of oxygen-depleted air can lead to death by asphyxiation (suffocation). Because asphyxiant gases are relatively inert and odorless, their presence in high concentration may not be noticed, except in the case of carbon dioxide (hypercapnia).

Toxic gases, by contrast, cause death by other mechanisms, such as competing with oxygen on the cellular level (e.g. carbon monoxide) or directly damaging the respiratory system (e.g. phosgene). Far smaller quantities of these are deadly.

Notable examples of asphyxiant gases are methane, nitrogen, argon, helium, butane and propane. Along with trace gases such as carbon dioxide and ozone, these compose 79% of Earth's atmosphere.

== Asphyxia hazard ==
Asphyxiant gases in the breathing air are normally not hazardous. Only where elevated concentrations of asphyxiant gases displace the normal oxygen concentration does a hazard exist. Asphyxiant gases are marked SA in the NFPA 704 standard. Examples of hazards are:

- Environmental gas displacement
  - Confined spaces, combined with accidental gas leaks, such as mines, submarines, refrigerators, or other confined spaces
  - Fire extinguisher systems that flood spaces with inert gases, such as computer data centers and sealed vaults
  - Large-scale natural release of gas, such as during the Lake Nyos disaster in which volcanically-released carbon dioxide killed 1,800 people.
  - Release of helium boiled off by the energy released in a magnet quench such as the Large Hadron Collider or a magnetic resonance imaging machine.
  - Climbing inside an inflatable balloon filled with helium
- Direct administration of gas
  - Inadvertent administration of asphyxiant gas in respirators
  - Use in suicide and erotic asphyxiation

== Risk management ==
The risk of breathing asphyxiant gases is frequently underestimated leading to fatalities, typically from breathing helium in domestic circumstances and nitrogen in industrial environments.

The term asphyxiation is often mistakenly associated with the strong desire to breathe that occurs if breathing is prevented. This desire is stimulated from increasing levels of carbon dioxide. However, asphyxiant gases may displace carbon dioxide along with oxygen, preventing the victim from feeling short of breath. In addition the gases may also displace oxygen from cells, leading to loss of consciousness and death rapidly.

=== United States ===
The handling of compressed asphyxiant gases and the determination of appropriate environment for their use is regulated in the United States by the Occupational Safety and Health Administration (OSHA). The National Institute for Occupational Safety and Health (NIOSH) has an advisory role. OSHA requires employers who send workers into areas where the oxygen concentration is known or expected to be less than 19.5% to follow the provision of the Respiratory Protection Standard [29 CFR 1910.134]. Generally, work in an oxygen depleted environment requires an SCBA or airline respirator. The regulation also requires an evaluation of the worker's ability to perform the work while wearing a respirator, the regular training of personnel, respirator fit testing, periodic workplace monitoring, and regular respirator maintenance, inspection, and cleaning." Containers should be labeled according to OSHA's Hazard Communication Standard [29 CFR 1910.1200]. These regulations were developed in accordance with the official recommendations of the Compressed Gas Association (CGA) pamphlet P-1. The specific guidelines for prevention of asphyxiation due to displacement of oxygen by asphyxiant gases is covered under CGA's pamphlet SB-2, Oxygen-Deficient Atmospheres. Specific guidelines for use of gases other than air in back-up respirators is covered in pamphlet SB-28, Safety of Instrument Air Systems Backed Up by Gases Other Than Air.

==== Odorized gas ====
To decrease the risk of asphyxiation, there have been proposals to add warning odors to some commonly used gases such as nitrogen and argon. However, CGA has argued against this practice. They are concerned that odorizing may decrease worker vigilance, not everyone can smell the odorants, and assigning a different smell to each gas may be impractical. Another difficulty is that most odorants (e.g., the thiols) are chemically reactive. This is not a problem with natural gas intended to be burned as fuel, which is routinely odorized, but a major use of asphyxiants such as nitrogen, helium, argon and krypton is to protect reactive materials from the atmosphere.

== In mining ==
The dangers of excess concentrations of nontoxic gases has been recognized for centuries within the mining industry. The concept of black damp (or "stythe") reflects an understanding that certain gaseous mixtures could lead to death with prolonged exposure. Early mining deaths due to mining fires and explosions were often a result of encroaching asphyxiant gases as the fires consumed available oxygen. Early self-contained respirators were designed by mining engineers such as Henry Fleuss to help in rescue efforts after fires and floods. While canaries were typically used to detect carbon monoxide, tools such as the Davy lamp and the Geordie lamp were useful for detecting methane and carbon dioxide, two asphyxiant gases. When methane was present, the lamp would burn higher; when carbon dioxide was present, the lamp would gutter or extinguish. Modern methods to detect asphyxiant gases in mines led to the Federal Mine Safety and Health Act of 1977 in the United States which established ventilation standards in which mines should be "ventilated by a current of air containing not less than 19.5 volume per centum of oxygen, not more than 0.5 volume per centum of carbon dioxide".

== See also ==
- Inert gas asphyxiation
  - Controlled atmosphere killing, a method of execution using asphyxiant gases
- Limnic eruption
  - Lake Kivu
  - Lake Monoun
  - Lake Nyos
  - Mazuku
- Mining accidents
