= Haraldur Sigurðsson =

Icelandic volcanologist and geochemist (born 1939)

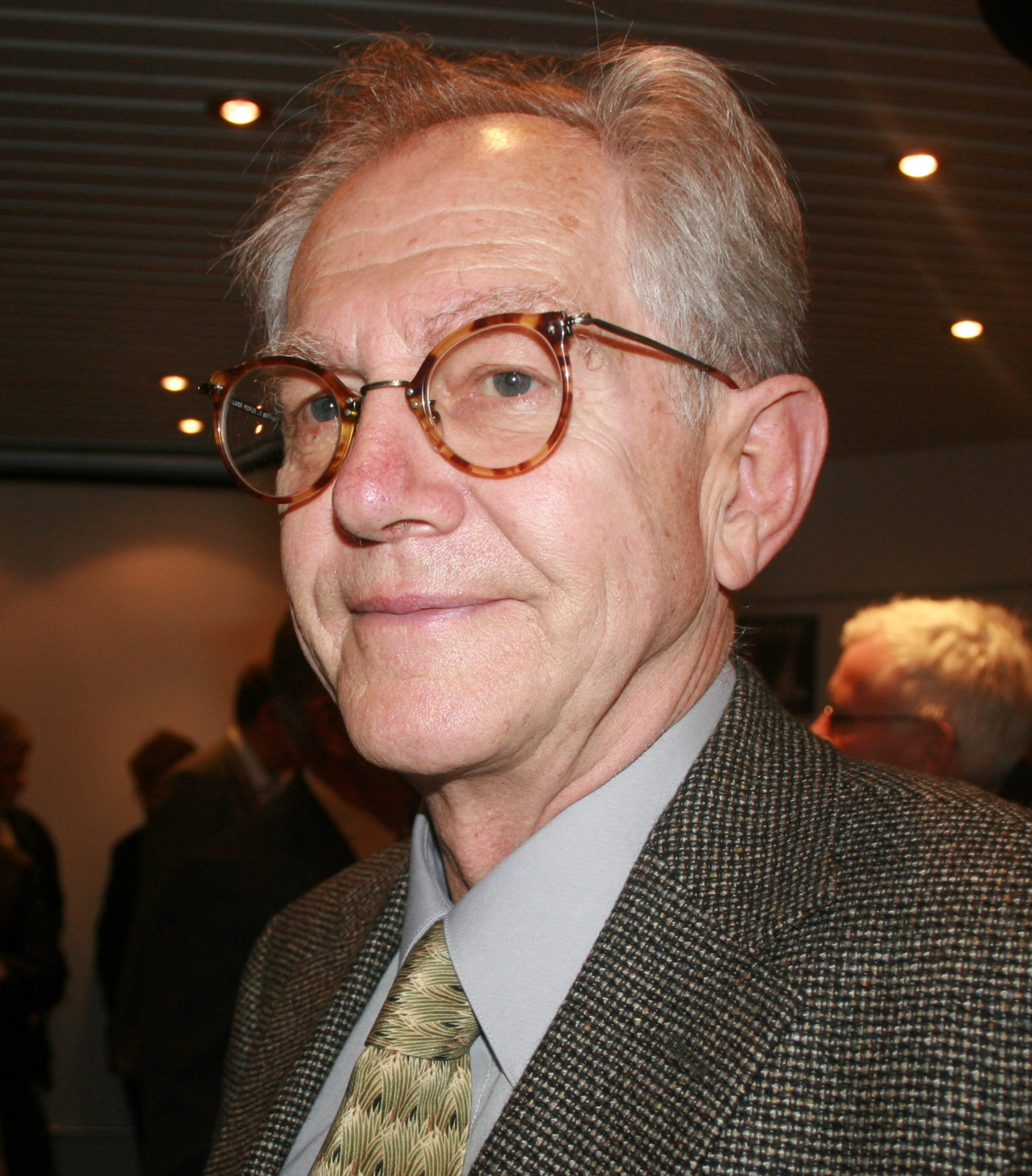
- Born: May 31, 1939 (age 87); Stykkishólmur, Iceland
- Education: Queen's University, Belfast (BSc); University of Durham (PhD)
- Scientific career
- Fields: Volcanology; Geochemistry
- Workplaces: University of Rhode Island
- Thesis: The petrology and chemistry of the Setberg volcanic region and of the intermediate and acid rocks of Iceland (1970)
- Doctoral advisor: George Malcolm Brown
- Website: vulkan.blog.is/blog/vulkan

Haraldur Sigurðsson or Haraldur Sigurdsson (born May 31, 1939) is an Icelandic volcanologist and geochemist.

== Education ==
Sigurdsson was born in Stykkishólmur in western Iceland. He studied geology and geochemistry in the United Kingdom, where he obtained a Bachelor of Science (BSc) degree from Queen's University, Belfast, followed by a PhD under the supervision of George Malcolm Brown from Durham University in 1970.

== Career and research ==
Sigurdsson worked on monitoring and research of the volcanoes of the Caribbean until 1974, when he was appointed professor at the Graduate School of Oceanography, University of Rhode Island. He is best known for his work on the reconstruction of major volcanic eruptions of the past, including the eruption of Vesuvius in 79 AD in Italy and the consequent destruction of the Roman cities of Pompeii and Herculaneum.

In 1991, Sigurdsson discovered tektite glass spherules at the Cretaceous–Paleogene boundary (K–T boundary) in Haiti, providing proof for a meteorite impact at the time of the extinction of the dinosaurs. In 2004 he discovered the lost town of Tambora in Indonesia, which was buried by the colossal 1815 explosive eruption of Tambora volcano. In 1999, Sigurdsson published a scholarly account of the history of volcanology. He was also editor in chief of the Encyclopedia of Volcanoes, also published in 1999. He was awarded the Coke Medal of the Geological Society of London in 2004.

Sigurdsson was a key scientist to uncover the sources of lake overturn that took the lives of entire villages nearby Lake Monoun and Lake Nyos in Cameroon. His story was popularized by the YouTuber MrBallen in an episode in January 2023.

=== Active blogs ===
Sigurdsson has in recent years been active in blogging in Icelandic on various issues related to his science, geology and geochemistry. There he has also been active in criticizing USA government, world capitalism and activities of Chinese companies in the Arctic. He openly supports the left movement in USA. Sigurdsson has written on the Solarsilicon Project being developed by the US Company Silicor Materials Inc. in Iceland and its pollution. As well as other environmental issues including global warming.

=== Publications ===
- Jordan, Benjamin R.; Haraldur Sigurdsson; Steven Carey (2008). Ignimbrites in Central America and Associated Caribbean Sea Tephra: Correlation and Petrogenesis. Saarbrücken: VDM Verlag Dr. Müller. p. 224. ISBN 978-3-639-10831-6.
- Haraldur Sigurdsson; Steven Carey (1990). Caribbean volcanoes a field guide. Open Library. p. 107.
- H. Sigurdsson; W.C. Evans (1987). Lake Nyos revisited:: a preliminary report. p. 7.
- Haraldur Sigursson; Paolo Laj (1990). Sulfur mass loading of the atmosphere from volcanic eruptions:: calibration of the ice core record on basis of sulfate aerosol deposition in polar regions from the 1982 El Chichon eruption, NASA grant NAG51304. Narragansett, RI; Washington, DC; Springfield, VA: University of Rhode Island Graduate School of Oceanography, National Aeronautics and Space Administration, National Technical Information Service.
- Sigurdsson, Haraldur (1999). Melting the Earth:: the history of ideas on volcanic eruptions. New York: Oxford University Press. p. 260. ISBN 0-19-510665-2.
- Haraldur Sigurdsson; Steven Carey (2008). Volcanoes and the Environment:: Exploring the Earth System. Academic Press. p. 450. ISBN 978-0-12-643141-4.
