= Sigurðsson =

Surname list

Sigurðsson is an Icelandic patronymic, meaning son of Sigurður. In Old Norse and Icelandic names, the name is not strictly a surname because it is not a family name.

People with the name Sigurðsson include:

- Arnar Sigurðsson (b. 1981), Icelandic professional tennis player
- Baldur Sigurðsson (b. 1985), Icelandic professional football player
- Birgir Sigurðsson (handballer) (b. 1965), Icelandic handball player
- Birgir Sigurðsson (writer) (1937–2019), Icelandic journalist and poet
- Dagur Sigurðsson (b. 1973), Icelandic professional handball player and coach
- Fríða Vágsheyg Sigurðsson, Danish-Faroese singer
- Gylfi Sigurðsson (b. 1989), Icelandic professional football player
- Hannes Sigurðsson (b. 1983), Icelandic professional football player
- Haraldur Sigurðsson (b. 1939), Icelandic volcanologist and geologist
- Helgi Sigurðsson (b. 1974), Icelandic professional football player
- Hreiðar Már Sigurðsson (b. 1970), Icelandic businessman and bank manager
- Indriði Sigurðsson (b. 1981), Icelandic professional football player
- Jón Sigurðsson (1811–1879), leader of the Icelandic independence movement; his face is on the 500 kronur note
- Jónas Sigurðsson (b. 1974), Icelandic singer
- Kristján Örn Sigurðsson (b. 1980), Icelandic professional football player
- Lárus Sigurðsson (b. 1973), Icelandic professional football player
- Ólafur Jóhann Sigurðsson (1918–1988), Icelandic author and poet
- Ragnar Sigurðsson (b. 1986), Icelandic professional football player
- Robbie Sigurðsson (b. 1993), Icelandic ice hockey player
- Sigfús Sigurðsson (1922–1999), Olympic shot putter from Iceland
- Sigfús Sigurðsson (born 1975), Olympic handball player from Iceland, grandson of the above
- Stefán Örn Sigurðsson (born 1954), Icelandic footballer
- Sveinn Rúnar Sigurðsson (b. 1976), Icelandic pianist
- Þráinn Sigurðsson (1912–2004), Icelandic chess player
- Valgeir Sigurðsson (b. 1971), Icelandic record producer and composer

== See also ==
- Sigurðardóttir
- Sigurðarson
