= Sigurðarson =

Sigurðarson is an Icelandic patronymic meaning "son of Sigurður". In Old Norse and Icelandic names, it is not a family name. People with this name include:

- Björn Bergmann Sigurðarson (born 1991), Icelandic international footballer
- Dagur Sigurðarson (1937–1994), Icelandic poet, translator and visual artist
- Guttormr Sigurðarson (1199–1204), King of Norway from January–August 1204, during the Norwegian civil war era
- Hákon Sigurðarson (c. 937 – 995), de facto ruler of Norway from about 975 to 995
- Haraldr Sigurðarson (1015–1066), King of Norway from 1046 to 1066 as Harald III
- Jakob Sigurðarson (born 1982), professional Icelandic basketball player
- Jón Trausti Sigurðarson (born 1982), Icelandic marketing director
- Stefán Ingi Sigurðarson (born 2001), Icelandic footballer
- Sverrir Sigurðarson (1145–1202), King of Norway from 1177 to 1202

== See also ==
- Sigurðsson
- Sigurdson
