= Sigurðardóttir =

Sigurðardóttir is an Icelandic patronymic, meaning daughter of Sigurður. In Icelandic names, the name is not strictly a surname because it is not a family name. The name refers to:

- Agnes M. Sigurðardóttir (b. 1954), Icelandic bishop
- Ásta Sigurðardóttir (1930–1971), Icelandic writer and visual artist
- Elín Edda Sigurðardóttir (born 1989), Icelandic long-distance runner
- Jóhanna Sigurðardóttir (b. 1942), Icelandic politician, prime minister of Iceland from January 2009 until May 2012
- Ragna Sigurðardóttir (author) (born 1962), Icelandic author and artist
- Ragna Sigurðardóttir (politician) (born 1992), Icelandic politician
- Sigurlín Margrét Sigurðardóttir (b. 1964), Icelandic politician; first deaf person to be a member of the Alþing
- Steinunn Sigurðardóttir (b. 1950), Icelandic author and poet
- Yrsa Sigurðardóttir (b. 1963), Icelandic author of crime novels and children’s stories
- Zuilma Gabriela Sigurðardóttir (b. 1962), Icelandic professor in psychology

== See also ==
- Sigurðsson
