= Chah, Cameroon =

Village in Cameroon

Chah
- Village
- Location within Cameroon
- Coordinates: 6°28′41″N 10°13′46″E
- Country: Cameroon
- Province: North-West
- Commune: Zhoa

Population (2005)
  - Total: 593

Chah, or Cha, is a village in the Northwest Province of Cameroon that was largely abandoned after the Lake Nyos disaster of 1986, when an eruption of carbon dioxide from nearby Lake Nyos killed many of its inhabitants. The village's population in 2005 was 593, 147 of which were men, and 446 were women.

The village's infrastructure consists of at least seven kilometers of road, two bridges, and seven culverts.

There are concerns about the stability of the natural rock wall that holds back the lake water. Regardless, the area was resettled after the disaster and reportedly has highly fertile soil.
