= Mazuku =

Pocket of carbon dioxide–rich air that can be lethal

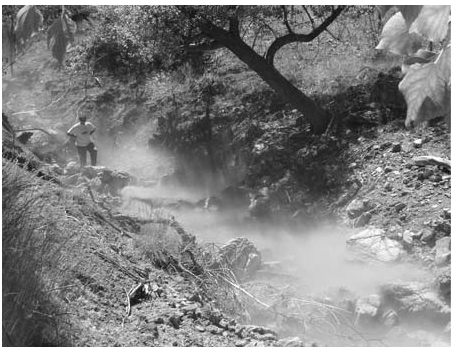
Mazuku forming in a low morphological depression on the foothills of Mt. Amiata, Italy, where CO_{2}-rich fog accumulates in a ditch

Mazuku (Swahili for "evil winds") are pockets of dry, cold carbon dioxide-rich gases released from vents or fissures in volcanically and tectonically active areas, mixed with dispersed atmospheric air and accumulating in typically low-lying areas. Since carbon dioxide (CO_{2}) is ~1.5 times heavier than air, it tends to flow downhill, hugging the ground like a low fog and gathering in enclosed spaces with poor ventilation—such as lava tubes, ditches, depressions, caves, and house basements—or in the stratified water layers of meromictic lakes if a water column exists. In high concentrations (≥ 1% by volume), they can pose a deadly risk to both humans and animals in the surrounding area because they are undetectable by olfactory or visual senses in most conditions.

Mazuku primarily occur on the northern shores of Lake Kivu to either side of the twin towns of Goma (Democratic Republic of the Congo) and Gisenyi (Rwanda), where local communities use this term in their vernacular (Kinyabwisha language) to describe the dangerous gases. They believe mazuku occur in cursed locations where invisible forces roam, silently killing people in the night while they sleep. In many places where mazuku occur, CO_{2} levels fall during daytime but can rise to significantly dangerous concentration levels of about 90% at night, early mornings, or evening hours, posing a great threat. This is because at night the atmospheric temperature drops and wind speeds significantly reduce. These conditions slow the dispersal of these heavy gases into the atmosphere, allowing them to accumulate in lower-lying areas, such as valleys and depressions.

== Geological setting and occurrence ==
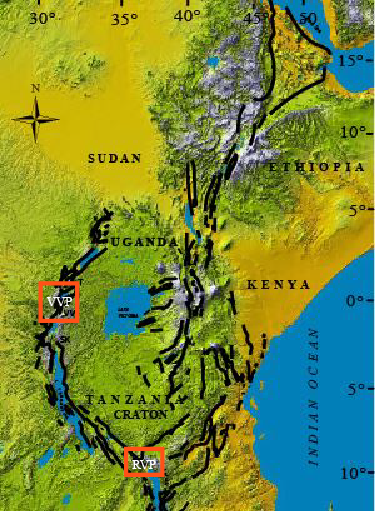
Map of the East African Rift System (EARS), spanning ~4,000 km and showing the Eastern and Western rift branches. The map highlights areas of tectonic activity, volcanic hazards, and CO_{2} gas releases, including mazuku emissions, particularly on the Virunga Volcanic Province (VVP) and the Rungwe Volcanic Province (RVP) (red squares)

The East African Rift System (EARS) is formed by the divergence of three ancient cratonic plates: the Somalian plate, the Nubian plate, and the Arabian plate, which are splitting apart due to the influence of a mantle plume beneath them. The rift extends ~4,000 km, starting from the Afar triple junction in the northern Ethiopian Plateau and running southwards. It is divided into two main segments: the volcanically active Eastern branch (~45 Ma), which passes through Djibouti, Eritrea, Kenya, and northeastern Tanzania; and the younger, seismically active Western branch (~5 and 8 Ma), that cuts through the Democratic Republic of the Congo (DRC), Uganda, Rwanda, Burundi, southwestern Tanzania, Zambia, Malawi, and Zimbabwe and terminates at the Okavango Delta in Botswana. The rifting process is responsible for the tectonic and volcanic activity in East Africa, leading to the formation of deep rift lake basins, such as Lake Tanganyika, Lake Malawi, Lake Rukwa, Lake Albert, and Lake Kivu, as well as frequent natural disasters such as earthquakes, volcanic eruptions, and massive landslides, along with prolonged dry CO_{2}-rich gas emissions like mazuku (toxic gas) releases.

It has been observed that most mazukus are found along the Western branch of the EARS, particularly in areas of active volcanic and tectonic activity. These areas include:

- Virunga Volcanic Province (VVP) at the foothills of the volcanic mountains of Nyamulagira and Nyiragongo, north of Lake Kivu, and particularly in the busy city centers of Goma and Sake (DRC) and Gisenyi (Rwanda).
- Rungwe Volcanic Province (RVP) in southwestern Tanzania, at the triple junction of the Tanganyika–Malawi–Usangu rifts, where CO_{2} is mined commercially by TOL Company Limited for supply to the beverage industry.

== Formation ==
Geologically, mazuku are natural CO_{2} emissions linked to magmatically and tectonically active regions, such as young and active or dormant volcanic systems, active hydrothermal systems, and deep fault structures systems. Isotopic signatures from helium and CO_{2} gas analyses confirm that the origin of mazuku is mainly magmatic, as opposed to thermal decomposition of organic matter. These gases are temporarily trapped and stored in subsurface pockets, such as lava tubes formed during previous eruptions, and remain isolated from the rest of the surrounding hydrothermal system. Over time, they are released following porous pathways and channeled to the surface through a network of extensional fissures, faults, or fractures. Once at the surface, they accumulate in cavities or in low-lying areas (depressions) due to their densities and the influence of gravity. In meromictic lakes such as Lake Kivu, Lake Nyos, and Lake Monoun, the CO_{2}-rich gases remain trapped in the dense, cold, and anoxic stratified lower layers (monimolimnion), which do not mix with the O_{2}-rich surface layers (mixolimnion) due to density discrepancies.

In anoxic zones, methanogenic bacteria convert carbon dioxide (CO_{2}) into methane (CH_{4}) through a process called methanogenesis, whereby over time, both CO_{2} and CH_{4} accumulate under extremely high pressure, creating a potential future limnic eruption disaster. However, CH_{4} is currently extracted economically in Lake Kivu through degassing, which reduces the risk of a dangerous limnic eruption while providing an energy source for power generation. Mazuku can extend up to 100m in length and cover an area of up to 4,700m^{2}, as seen in the mazuku of Bulengo Seminaire on the shores of Lake Kivu, DRC. It has been observed that there is a strong correlation between the occurrence and location of mazuku with the regional alignment of tectonic faults and fracture network.

== Geochemical composition and origin ==
The geochemical composition of mazuku gases consists mainly of CO_{2} and a variable mixture of other atmospheric components, such as N_{2}, O_{2}, and argon (Ar), with smaller amounts of methane (CH_{4}), hydrogen sulfide (H_{2}S), and water vapour. In these gases, CO_{2} concentrations range between 12% and 99%, argon concentrations range from 0.01% to 0.85%, and CH_{4} concentrations range from 0.0002% to 0.002%. Helium is also present in low concentrations, ranging between 0.0003% and 0.004%.

The isotopic signature of He-Ar and CO_{2} systematics identify mazuku sources to be derived from both the mantle (magmatic sources) and the crust, with significant potential secondary modification processes such as magma mixing and solubility-driven degassing fractionation. The dry gases are continuously released very slowly through a passive degassing mechanism from the earth's interior via vents, fractures, cracks, hot springs, fumaroles, and gas plumes, without the need or presence of an active volcanic eruption.

=== Surface manifestations ===
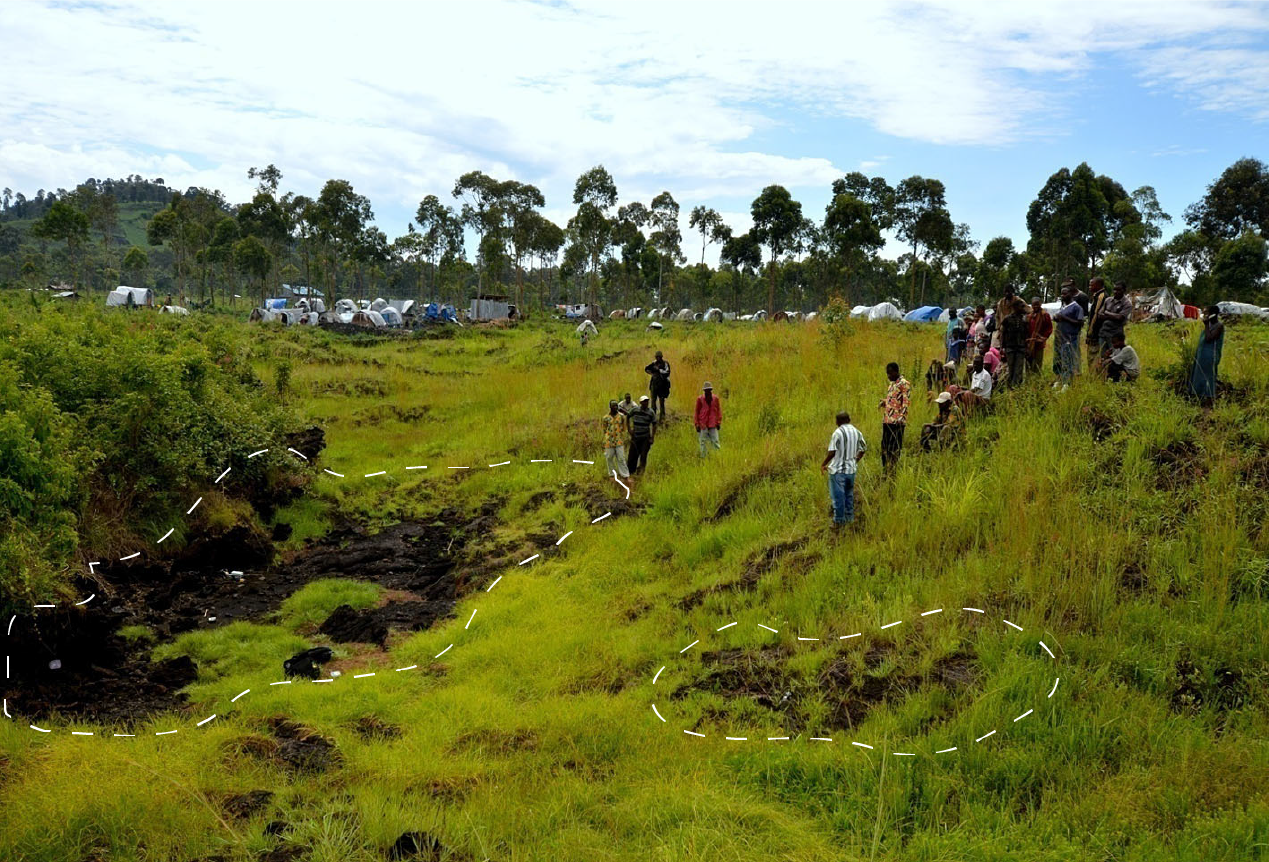
Patchy vegetation and bareland areas due to high CO_{2} flux in the soil around the lava front near Goma city (particularly affecting the areas surrounding refugee camps)

Areas with mazuku can be readily identified in the field through several distinctive characteristics and features, such as:

- Peculiar types and species of vegetation that thrive in CO_{2}-rich waters and gases, such as cyperus papyrus, fern, reeds, and grasses.
- Burnt-out vegetation and altered rocks due to high acidity levels associated with normally elevated CO_{2} concentrations (70–90v.%), resulting in patches of weathered bareland.
- Regions with ultrahigh CO_{2} concentrations, where the high CO_{2}/O_{2} ratio can be perceived as a sensation of heat on human skin, a condition related to hypercapnia. This includes tingling and burning sensations in the mouth, lips, eyes, and nose because of the acidic nature of CO_{2} reacting with surface moisture to form a weak carbonic acid that irritates these soft body parts.
- Systematic occurrences of dead animals—such as insects, rodents, and reptiles, alongside larger animals like cattle, dogs, and goats—indicate areas of high CO_{2} concentration.
- Bulging and swelling of the ground due to pressure caused by CO_{2} accumulation.

These characteristics collectively aid in the identification of mazuku regions in the field.

=== Factors affecting CO_{2} levels in mazuku ===
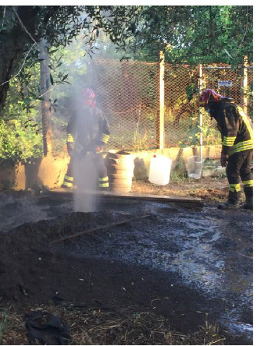
A well drilled through a pressurized gas pocket triggered a series of CO_{2} blowouts along a fault line.

CO_{2} levels in mazuku areas are affected and influenced by a combination of various factors.

==== Geological factors ====
- Increased volcanic and seismic activities: CO_{2} concentration levels may increase proportionally with volcanic and seismic activities (e.g. earthquakes), which can produce more permeable fractures in the earth's crust, allowing more CO_{2} to escape from underground and forming new degassing zones.

==== Anthropogenic activities ====
- Unauthorized well drilling: For instance, at Colli Albali volcano in Italy, a well was dug through a pressurized gas pocket, causing it to explode. This created a low-pressure zone leading to more CO_{2} gas dispersion in the area and resulted in three more gas blowouts along a continuous fault line.
- Tarmac roads construction: Tarmac roads and concrete surfaces can seal natural gas conduits, blocking the natural flow of gas and leading to its accumulation. As trapped gases build up pressure, they can bulge and swell the ground, and release explosively (gas blowout) when they eventually escape. This can cause a road collapse or other infrastructure damage.
- Drilling of pit latrines: A man died from asphyxiation near the foothills of Ngozi volcanic crater, in the Rungwe Volcanic Province in Tanzania, while digging a 6m deep pit latrine. This was likely caused by the accumulation of hazardous gases in the hole after the gas pockets were mechanically disturbed. CO_{2} continuously degasses in the area to date, leading to more deaths of birds, cows, and rodents due to the toxic gas buildup.

==== Meteorological parameters ====
- Pressure: Pressure variations in the atmosphere have an inverse relationship with CO_{2} emissions from the soil; i.e. when the atmospheric pressure drops the CO_{2} emissions are high, but when pressure rises the CO_{2} emissions are lower.
- Wind speed: Low wind speed decreases the chance of CO_{2} dispersion to the atmosphere and allows heavy gases to accumulate in low-lying areas like valleys and depressions.
- Soil moisture content and season: During heavy winter rains, subsurface soil voids are totally filled with water, into which dissolve a significant amount of CO_{2}. In contrast, when the soil is dry during summer, these voids remain empty and can accumulate large amounts of degassed CO_{2}, which can escape and fill in low-lying areas, posing great health risks.
- Time of day: At night, with no solar radiation and reduced solar intensity, atmospheric temperatures drop and wind speeds decrease significantly. These conditions slow the dispersal of heavy gases, causing them to accumulate in low-lying areas. During the day, sunlight heats the air, creating low pressure that allows CO_{2} emissions to rise and disperse, reducing the risk of dangerous concentration levels.

== CO_{2} exposure health effects and international guideline limits ==
The health hazards linked to both short-term and long-term exposure of lethal doses of CO_{2} in mazuku are outlined in the table below, along with permissible exposure limits (PELs) for CO_{2} to promote safety in workplaces and for residents near active volcanic areas. These limits specify safe exposure durations at various concentrations to help prevent health risks over time.

CO_{2} concentration % (mixed with air)	Short term exposure effects	Long term exposure effects	Average time of exposure
0–1.5%	Mostly unnoticed by olfactory or visual senses	More noticeable conditions such as shortness of breath, lightheadedness, and dizziness	8 hours maximum exposure
1.5–6%	Difficulty in breathing, increased heart rate, dyspnoea (shortness of breath)	Tingling sensations in lips, eyes, and nose because of the acidic nature of CO_{2}, which reacts with surface moisture to form a weak carbonic acid that irritates these soft body parts	15 minutes maximum exposure
6–10%	Dizziness, buzzing sound in ears, lightheadedness, muscular and joint weakness, drowsiness, headaches, sweating, shortness of breath, low mood and mental distress, fainting, increased heart rate	Dizziness and loss of consciousness	Tolerable within a span of several minutes
11–15%	Severe abrupt muscle contractions, caused because body cells lack enough oxygen for respiration and subsequently become unconscious within few seconds.	Severe muscle cramps and loss of consciousness	Death in less than a minute
˃ 25%	Intolerable amount of CO_{2} for full functioning of the human body. Generally a victim suffers convulsions, coma, and finally death.	Convulsions, coma, and death	Death in less than a minute

== Case studies ==
Mazuku occur in various parts of the world where volcanic or geologically active regions release CO_{2}-rich gases. These gases accumulate in low-lying areas, valleys, or confined spaces or in the stratified water layers of meromictic lakes, creating hazardous conditions and deadly asphyxiation zones for humans, wildlife, and plants. The following are case studies.

=== Lake Monoun ===
Lake Monoun is a volcanic crater lake situated in the Oku Volcanic Field, which is part of the Cameroon Volcanic Line. It was formed when a lava flow created a natural barrier. In 1984, the lake experienced a deadly gas exsolution, triggering a violent limnic eruption that killed 37 people. The primary source of the gas was volcanic CO_{2} emissions, confirmed by carbon isotope signatures, which had accumulated in the lake's stratified waters over time, leading to increased pressure. Seismic activity and an underwater landslide were responsible for the disturbance of the lake's stratification, releasing the trapped CO_{2} violently and causing a very dangerous gas outburst.

=== Lake Nyos ===
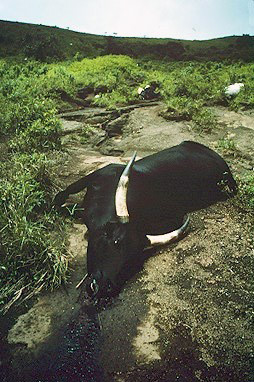
Cow suffocated and killed by CO_{2} during Lake Nyos limnic eruption in Cameroon, 1986

A similar scenario occurred two years later in 1986 at Lake Nyos, another crater lake in Cameroon, often referred to as a "killer lake". The lake experienced a catastrophic limnic eruption, also known as a "lake overturn", a rare phenomenon in which dissolved volcanic gases are released from the stratified bottom layers of lakes after a mechanical disturbance. The ensuing sudden release of an overwhelming amount of CO_{2} led to the deaths of 1,700 people and 300 cattle.

Geologically, the crater lake sits over a network of active faults and lineaments and is fed underneath by volatile-rich basaltic dikes. These dikes release magmatic gases and volatiles like CO_{2} and H_{2}O, which, upon their release at low pressure, likely contributed to a phreatomagmatic explosive eruption that formed a diatreme beneath the lake and a maar depression on the surface.

Normally, a mazuku involves dry CO_{2} gas seeping through fissures and accumulating in low-lying areas before dispersing into the atmosphere. However, when gas columns are obstructed by rock strata, such as thick pyroclastic deposits or the stratified water of meromictic lakes, the gases remain trapped or dissolved, respectively, in the lake waters. The Lake Nyos disaster is an example of the latter, when CO_{2}-rich gas significantly accumulated in the water under extreme pressure.

It is believed that a landslide triggered the exsolution of the dissolved gases, which caused a limnic eruption. As a result, a massive CO_{2} cloud (about 98% CO_{2} by volume) rose from the lake's floor (208m deep), spread over and down the valleys, engulfed the nearby villages, and killed everything by asphyxiation.

=== Mammoth Mountain ===
Mammoth Mountain, a dormant volcano in the Sierra Nevada region of California, United States, is underlaid by a shallow dacitic dome that releases cold and dry CO_{2}-rich gases (98v% CO_{2}) through fumarole vents and fractures located on the flanks of the mountain. The gas fluxes were estimated at a rate of ~1,200 tonnes per day, comparable to gas fluxes observed at the summit craters of Kīlauea in Hawaii, Mount Etna in Italy, and Mount St. Helens in Washington. The CO_{2} originates from deeper magmatic sources (as evidenced from He-CO_{2} isotopic signature) at about 10 km below the surface, and travels through permeable networks of fractures and faults. The CO_{2}-rich gases accumulate in the soil layers at depths between 0.6–1m, in closed subsurface cavities, and in snow caves, suggesting an ongoing active magmatic activity beneath the mountain.

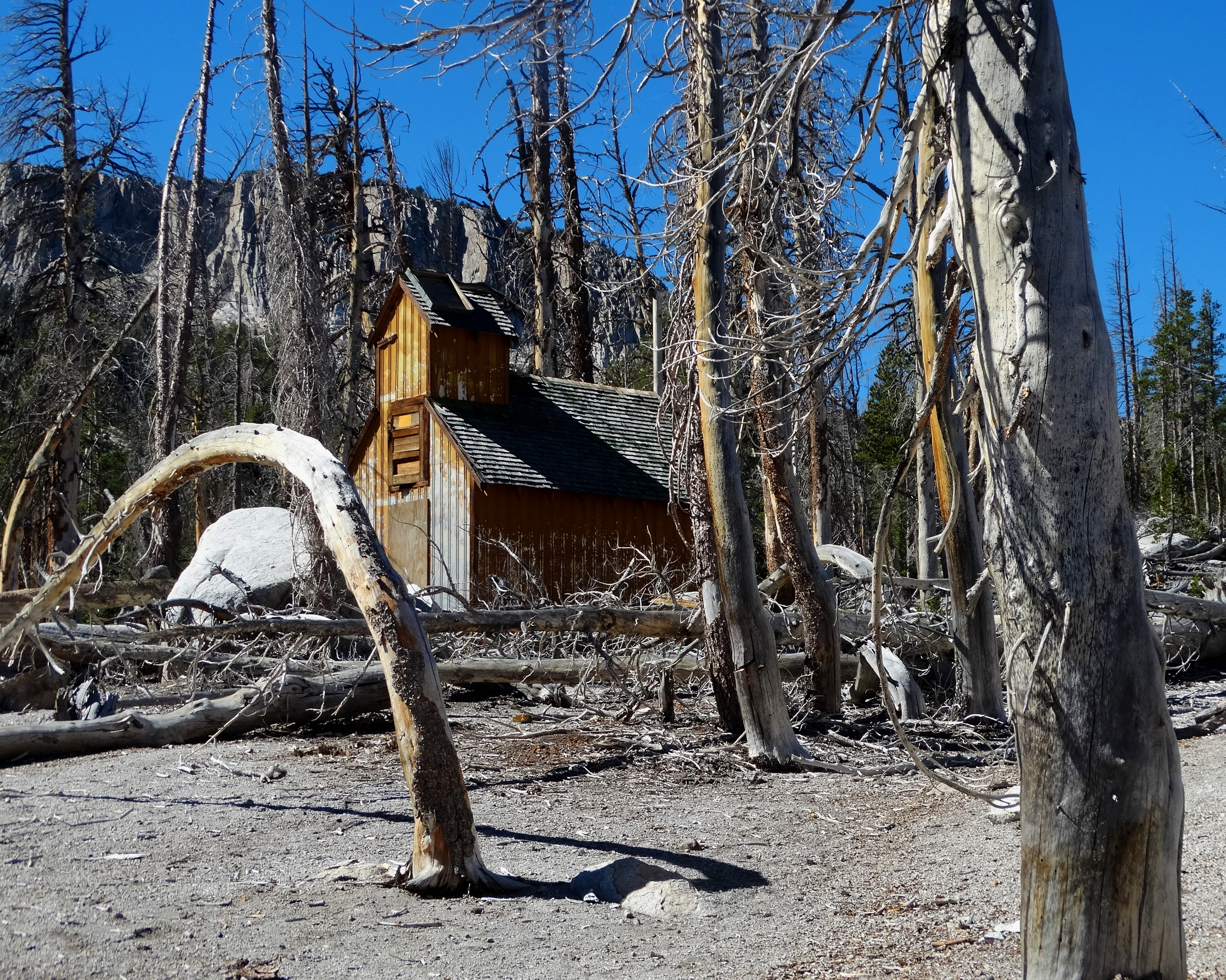
Dead trees at Mammoth Mountain in California due to increased CO_{2} levels in the soil, leading to toxic acidity and effects on plant health

One visible manifestation of this toxic degassing is the large-scale mortality of coniferous trees, covering an area of up to 100 hectares on the mountain's flanks. The accumulation of CO_{2} in closed depressions and subsurface soil layers exposes tree roots to toxic gases, leading to widespread tree death. In addition to CO_{2} poisoning, the trees are affected by highly altered and acidic soils. The region also experiences frequent earthquakes, often with up to magnitudes of 6 on the Richter scale. These seismic events, combined with the mountain's bulging and exhumation, fracture the surface and allow high-pressure volatiles to escape, further releasing CO_{2} into the zone.

=== Monte Amiata ===
Monte Amiata is a dormant volcano located in Tuscany, central Italy, known for its significant emissions of dry and cold CO_{2}-rich gases, which are primarily magmatic in origin. The gases originate from the deep geothermal system beneath the volcano and pass through a permeable network of faults and fractures by passive mechanism degassing processes. Although the area has not experienced recent volcanic eruptions, it remains geothermally active, with CO_{2} emissions contributing to environmental risks like soil acidification and potential CO_{2} build-up in low-lying areas, posing hazards to local wildlife and humans. The region is also notable for its significance in geothermal energy production, and gas emissions are closely monitored to assess both volcanic hazards and energy sustainability.

=== Mount Sinila ===
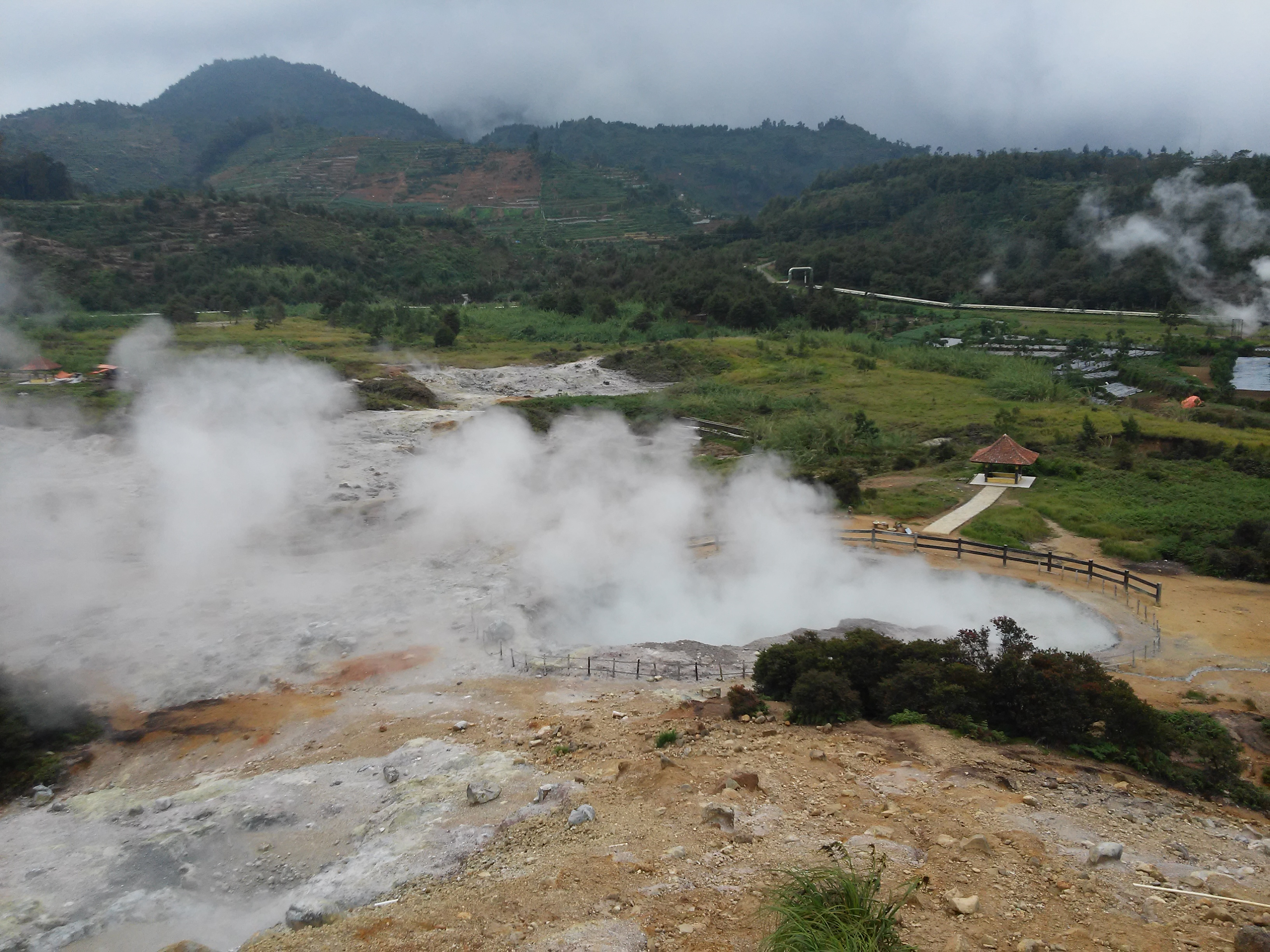
Dry CO_{2} emissions observed on the Diëng Plateau, Indonesia, highlight volcanic activity and the potential hazards of gas releases.

Mt. Sinila is a volcanic mountain located on the Diëng Plateau in Indonesia. In 1979 it experienced a tragic phreatic eruption disaster when a mixture of steam, lahar, and toxic gases was released from the open cracks and fissures located near the crater and gushed down the valley, asphyxiating insects, rodents, goats, dogs, and cows, as well as claiming the lives of 172 people. Before the eruption, the area experienced a series of earthquakes that reactivated ancient fractures over the span of a few hours. After a few hours during the main course of eruption, dry gas was emitted from a new 1,000m-long fissure that had emerged on the western flank of the volcano near Sumur crater. Gas analysis revealed that the dry gas was CO_{2}-rich from magmatic sources, with concentrations reaching up to 99% by volume. Since CO_{2} is heavier than air, it flowed down the valley, displacing oxygen and hugging the ground like fog. All victims were found dead in a linear path of gas flow, likely caught them off guard as they slept, with the gas suffocating them simultaneously.

== Effects ==
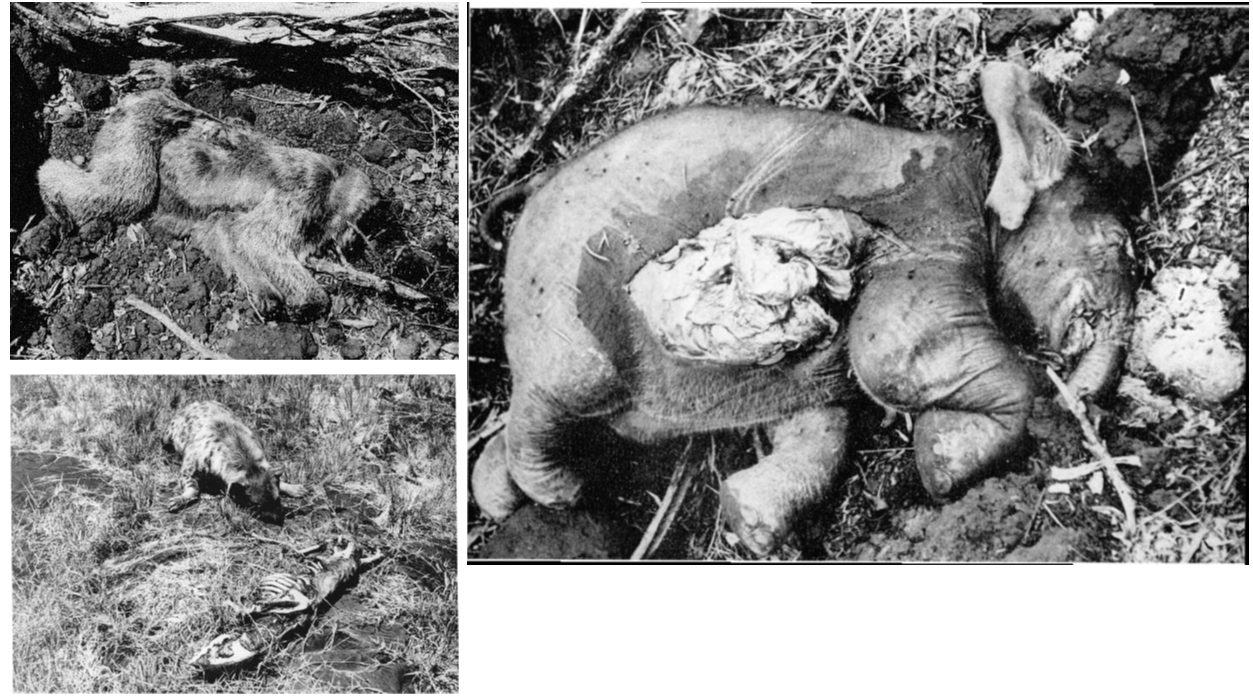
Diffuse CO_{2} gas emissions forming mazuku zones in Virunga National Park (DRC) have killed wild animals, including elephants, hyenas, and baboons.

Depending on their gas composition and concentration, mazuku can cause various effects on flora and fauna. Massive clouds of CO_{2}, such as those released from lakes in the 1980s, can cause widespread devastation of human and wildlife populations. Local vegetation is typically not very strongly affected. If the concentration of CO_{2} is high enough and maintained in a prolonged outgassing event, however, even vegetation can be affected by the mazuku, as is the case on Mammoth Mountain, where deforestation has occurred, as well as CO_{2} poisonings, including the deaths of two skiers, one in 1995 and one in 1998.

In some cases, mazuku are large enough to cause localized flora and fauna extinction events that are documented in the fossil record. For example, sediment core radiocarbon dating records from Lake Kivu have shown a sequence of repeated and regular massive lake overturn events approximately every 800–1000 years that were caused by methane explosions and tsunamis due to accumulation of magmatic CO_{2}.

If mazuku occurs underneath lakes, it can lead to changes in water chemistry, creating meromictic lakes that are dangerous for aquatic life. For example, the buildup of CO_{2} in Lake Kivu, Lake Nyos, and Lake Monoun caused stratification and oxygen depletion, affecting fish and other organisms living in the water.

=== Summary ===
	Country	Volcanic structure	Year occurred	Volcano state	CO_{2} release events	Measured CO_{2} conc.	Environmental effects	Casualties
1	DRC and Rwanda	Virunga Volcanic Province: Mt. Nyiragongo; Mt. Nyamulagira	1900s to present	Active	Dry CO_{2} degassing	90%	Acidic soil, death of animals due to ˃ 500,000 ppm of CO_{2} in the soil	~13 deaths per year
2	DRC	Virunga Volcanic Province: Lake Kivu	1900s to present	Active	Diffuse outgassing of CO_{2} into the lake water	˃ 25%	Water chemistry alteration, habitat disruption, loss of biodiversity	Dizziness and convulsions lead to 2 swimmers drowning; potential future catastrophic limnic eruption
3	Cameroon	Cameroon Volcanic Line: Lake Monoun	1984	Active	Limnic eruption	96.73%	Water chemistry alteration, habitat disruption, loss of biodiversity	37 people died
4	Cameroon	Cameroon Volcanic Line: Lake Nyos	1986	Active	Limnic eruption	98%	Water chemistry alteration, habitat disruption, loss of biodiversity	1,700 deaths
5	United States	Mammoth Mountain	1998	Dormant	Dry diffuse CO_{2} through the soil	98%	Acidic soil, barren land (~100 hectares in a tree-kill area and dead animals)	A skier died from acute pulmonary edema in a snow cave with ~98% CO_{2}
6	Indonesia	Diëng Plateau: Mt. Sinila	1979	Dormant	Phreatic eruption	99%	Tree kill zones due to acidic soils; dead reptiles and rodents	172 people died
7	Tanzania	Rungwe Volcanic Province: Mt. Rungwe; Mt. Ngozi	2001, 2004 and 2022	Dormant	Dry CO_{2} degassing	95%	Tree kill zones due to acidic soils; dead reptiles and rodents	1 man died while digging a pit latrine; 2 men died when they fell into a ditch
8	Italy	Vulcano Island	1980	Active	Diffuse CO_{2} on mountain flanks	50%	Tree kill zones due to acidic soils; dead reptiles and rodents	2 children died from asphyxiation
9	Italy	Lazio and Alban Hills	2000	Dormant	Dry diffuse CO_{2} through the soil	92.7%	Tree kill zones due to acidic soils; dead reptiles and rodents	1 man died when he fell into an abandoned well
10	Italy	Alban Hills: Cava dei Selci	2011	Dormant	Dry diffuse CO_{2} through the soil	99%	Cows and pets died from asyphixiation; gas blowouts, ground swells, and roads collapses	3 people died in an open spa
11	Japan	Hakkoda	1997	Dormant	Dry diffuse CO_{2} through the soil into depressions	15–20%	Bare land and a pattern of dead animals were observed	3 soldiers died after falling into a depression
12	Portugal	Furnas, São Miguel, Azores	1999	Active	Dry diffuse CO_{2} through the soil	99%	Tree kill zones due to acidic soils; dead reptiles and rodents	3 people died from asphyxiation in house cellars and a well

== Hazard assessment and mitigation ==
=== Hazard assessment ===
Areas experiencing mazuku emissions face multiple forms of hazards due to their proximity to active volcanoes.

==== Continuous hazards ====
These are long-lasting volcanic hazards that persist for extended periods of time, even without an active volcanic eruption. For instance, in regions near active volcanoes, such as the Virunga Volcanic Province, people, livestock, and wildlife in low-lying areas are silently asphyxiated by mazuku gases. The danger from mazuku remains constant, posing a long-term threat to communities living in these volcanic zones.

Long-term exposure to mazuku can lead to environmental degradation and loss of biodiversity. Agricultural lands may be impacted by CO_{2} accumulation in subsurface layers of soils, creating toxic acidic soil and leading to crop failures and economic disruption.

==== Latent hazards ====
Latent hazards are dormant threats that require an external trigger, such as a mechanical disturbance, to become dangerous and deadly under specific conditions. For example, meromictic lakes like Lake Nyos, Lake Kivu, and Lake Monoun can contain enormous amounts of dissolved carbon dioxide (and sometimes methane) in their deep stratified layers (monimolimnion). Under normal conditions, these gases remain trapped in the lower layers of the lake. However, if triggered by an external mechanical disturbance such as volcanic activity, an earthquake, or a landslide, these gases can release explosively in a limnic eruption. This could lead to widespread asphyxiation and fires across the surrounding regions.

Mazuku may also indicate deeper magmatic unrest, warning of further natural disasters such as earthquakes, volcanic eruptions, and landslides.

=== Mitigation measures ===
Due to the silent (colorless and odorless) and deadly nature of CO_{2} in volcanic active areas, authorities must be proactive and prepared to combat this natural hazard and reduce its hazardous effects. Some of the mitigation measures are:

On-ground CO_{2} detection sensors: Early warning systems can be installed in high-risk areas. For example, at Mt. Amiata in Italy, researchers employ soil CO_{2} flux sensors to measure diffuse CO_{2} emissions with a notable flux measurement of about 13,000 tons/day.

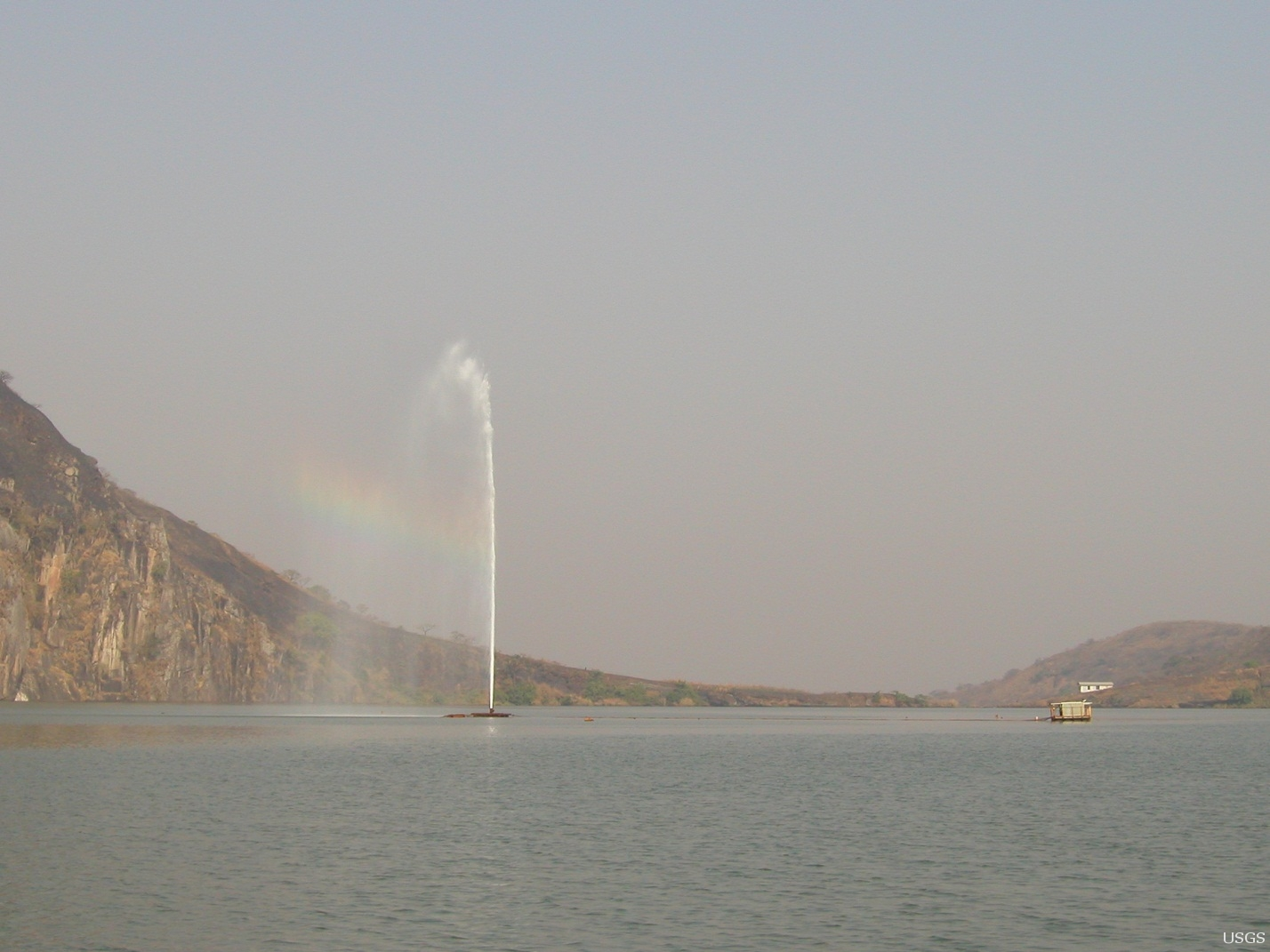
Artificial siphoning at Lake Nyos safely releases CO_{2} from deep lake layers, preventing pressure buildup and reducing the risk of a limnic eruption

Volcano geoengineering technologies: Human-induced degassing technologies can be employed in meromictic lakes to prevent the sudden natural release of gases. For instance, at Lake Nyos, siphons were installed to lower gas pressure by extracting CO_{2}-rich water from the lake's bottom saline layers. This process enables the dissolved carbon dioxide to escape into the atmosphere as the water rises to the surface. By reducing the concentration of dissolved gases, this method decreases the risk of catastrophic limnic eruptions, like the one happened in 1986. The siphon system effectively promotes controlled gas exsolution, preventing dangerous pressure build-up.

Land-use planning: Town planners can indicate buffer zones which are prone to mazuku and prevent settlements in these areas.

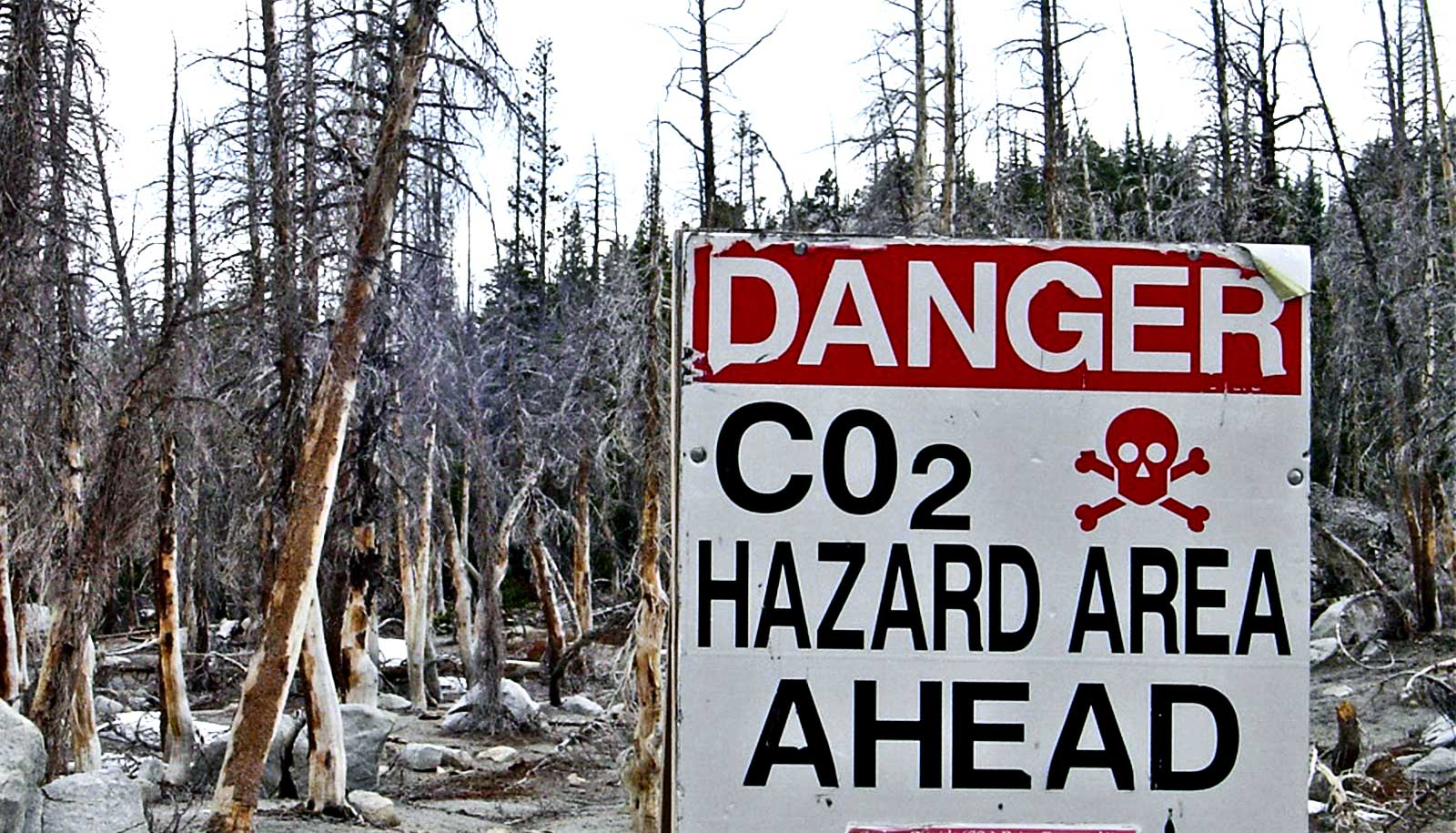
A hazard sign indicating high CO_{2} concentration at Mammoth Mountain in California, emphasizing danger and the need to take precaution when visiting these areas

Relocation and closing high CO_{2}-concentrated areas: For essential community safety, there should be immediate evacuation plans and warning signs in hazardous places.

Developing gas hazard and risk maps: Key CO_{2} data—such as soil gas concentrations, carbon isotopes (which help trace CO_{2} sources), and CO_{2} flux levels—should be collected in volcanic areas prone to mazuku. Mapping these areas through gas concentration and flux measurements can greatly help during construction and settlement allocation decisions.

Education and sensitization campaigns: There should be continued scientific research on CO_{2} emissions in volcanic active regions, including the creation and improvement of existing CO_{2} dispersion models on the causes and occurrence of mazuku.

== Mazuku's influence on climate ==
Volcanic mountains such as Mount Etna in Italy, Kilauea in Hawaii, Nyiragongo and Nyamulagira in Congo, and their adjoining areas are significant sources of magma-derived gases, releasing massive amounts of CO_{2} both during eruptions and through continuous magma upwelling (passive degassing) in non-eruptive states through fumaroles, hot springs, and gas plumes. For instance, during active eruptions, Mount Etna in Italy can emit up to 61,800 tons of CO_{2} per day. Even when not erupting, it is still passively degassing and it can emit around 137 tons of CO_{2} per day. The cycling of CO_{2} and other gases—such as sulfur dioxide, hydrogen sulfide, water vapor, and hydrogen chloride—is driven by magma convection, where degassed magma sinks, recharges with CO_{2} at depth, and rises again, ensuring a constant supply of volatile-rich magma, a process likely fueled by a mantle source beneath.

This process contributes to global warming primarily through their large, continuous emissions of the greenhouse gas CO_{2}. Volcanoes release significant amounts of CO_{2} into the atmosphere during both their quiescence and high eruptive activity periods. The continuous release and accumulation of CO_{2} (accounting for up to 10% of the global total budget) leads to an increase in the concentration of greenhouse gases in the atmosphere. This gas acts like a blanket, trapping heat that would otherwise be re-radiated into space, causing the heat to accumulate and, as a result, warming the Earth's surface. Although volcanic CO_{2} emissions are relatively small compared to human-caused emissions from burning fossil fuels, the persistent degassing of volcanoes like Mt. Etna still plays a role in the carbon cycle, indirectly contributing to climate change by increasing the amount of CO_{2} in the atmosphere.

== See also ==
- Cave of Dogs – Cave near Naples, Italy
- Fumarole – Volcanic opening that emits hot gases
- Whitedamp – Mixture of gases produced by combustion of coal
