= Sigurdson =

Sigurdson is a surname. Notable people with the surname include:

- Auburn Sigurdson (born 1981), Canadian softball pitcher
- Hal Sigurdson (1932–2012), Canadian sports journalist
- Larus Sigurdson (born 1973), Icelandic professional footballer who plays as a defender
- Lori Sigurdson (born 1961), Alberta member of the provincial legislature
- Nicole Sigurdson, American politician
- Stefan Sigurdson, candidate for councillor in the Winnipeg municipal election, 1995
- Tom Sigurdson (born 1957), former Canadian provincial level politician

== See also ==
- Sigurdsson
