= Mammoth Mountain =

Lava dome in the Sierra Nevada of California, United States

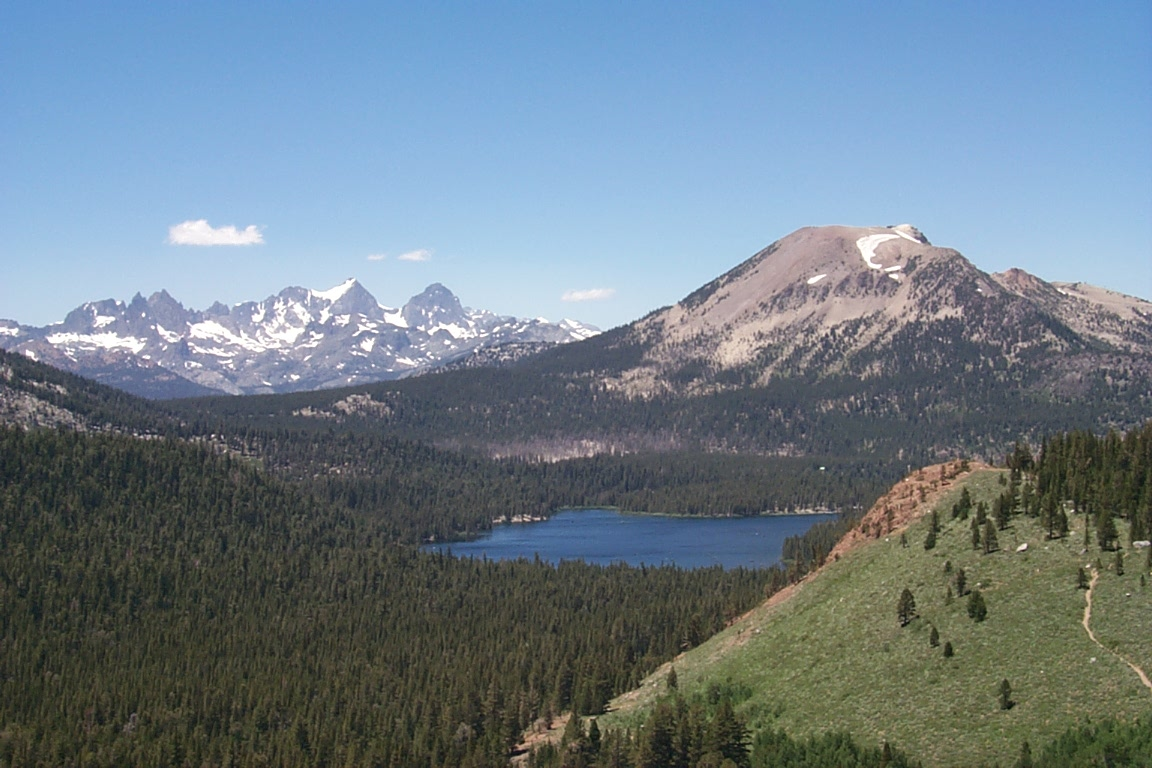
- Mammoth Mountain from the south, with Ritter Range behind

Highest point
- Elevation: 11,059 ft (3,371 m) NAVD 88
- Prominence: 1,647 ft (502 m)
- Listing: Mountains of California
- Coordinates: 37°37′50″N 119°01′57″W

Geography
- Location within California Location within the United States
- Country: United States
- State: California
- Counties: Madera; Mono
- Protected area: Inyo National Forest
- Parent range: Sierra Nevada
- Topo map: USGS Mammoth Mountain

Geology
- Rock age: About 50,000 to 200,000 years
- Mountain type: Lava dome complex
- Volcanic arc: Long Valley Caldera
- Last eruption: 1260 ± 40 years

Climbing
- Easiest route: Gondola

Mammoth Mountain is a lava dome complex partially located in the town of Mammoth Lakes, California, within the Inyo National Forest of Madera and Mono counties. It is home to a large ski area primarily on the Mono County side.

Mammoth Mountain was formed in a series of eruptions that ended 57,000 years ago. Mammoth Mountain still produces hazardous volcanic gases that kill trees.

== Geology ==
Mammoth Mountain is a lava dome complex in Mono County, California. It lies in the southwestern corner of the Long Valley Caldera and consists of about 12 rhyodacite and dacite overlapping domes. These domes formed in a long series of eruptions from 110,000 to 57,000 years ago, building a volcano that reaches 11,059 feet (3,371 m) in elevation. During this time, massive dacite eruptions occurred roughly every 5000 years. The volcano is still active with minor eruptions, the largest of which was a minor phreatic (steam) eruption 700 years ago.

Mammoth Mountain also lies on the south end of the Mono-Inyo chain of volcanic craters. The magma source for Mammoth Mountain is distinct from those of both the Long Valley Caldera and the Inyo Craters. Mammoth Mountain is composed primarily of dacite and rhyolite, part of which has been altered by hydrothermal activity from fumaroles (steam vents).

== Volcanic gas discharge ==
Volcanic gas emissions at Mammoth Mountain have been extensively studied due to their environmental and safety impacts.

Mammoth is degassing large amounts of carbon dioxide out of its south flank, near Horseshoe Lake, causing mazuku in that area. The concentration of carbon dioxide in the ground ranges from 20% to 90% CO_{2}. Measurements in the 1990s of the total discharge of carbon dioxide gas at the Horseshoe Lake tree-kill area ranged from 50 to 150 short tons (45 to 140 t) per day; this high concentration caused trees to die in six regions that total about 170 acres (0.69 km^{2}) in size (see photo).

The tree-kills originally were attributed to a severe drought that affected California in the late 1980s and early 1990s. Another idea was that the kills were the result of a pathogen or other biological infestation. However, neither idea explained why all trees in the affected areas were killed regardless of age or health. Then, in March 1990, a U.S. Forest Service ranger became ill with suffocation symptoms after being in a snow-covered cabin near Horseshoe Lake. Unusual CO_{2} rates were not identified until 1994, but through analysis of 14C quantity in tree rings, it was later inferred to have begun in 1990.

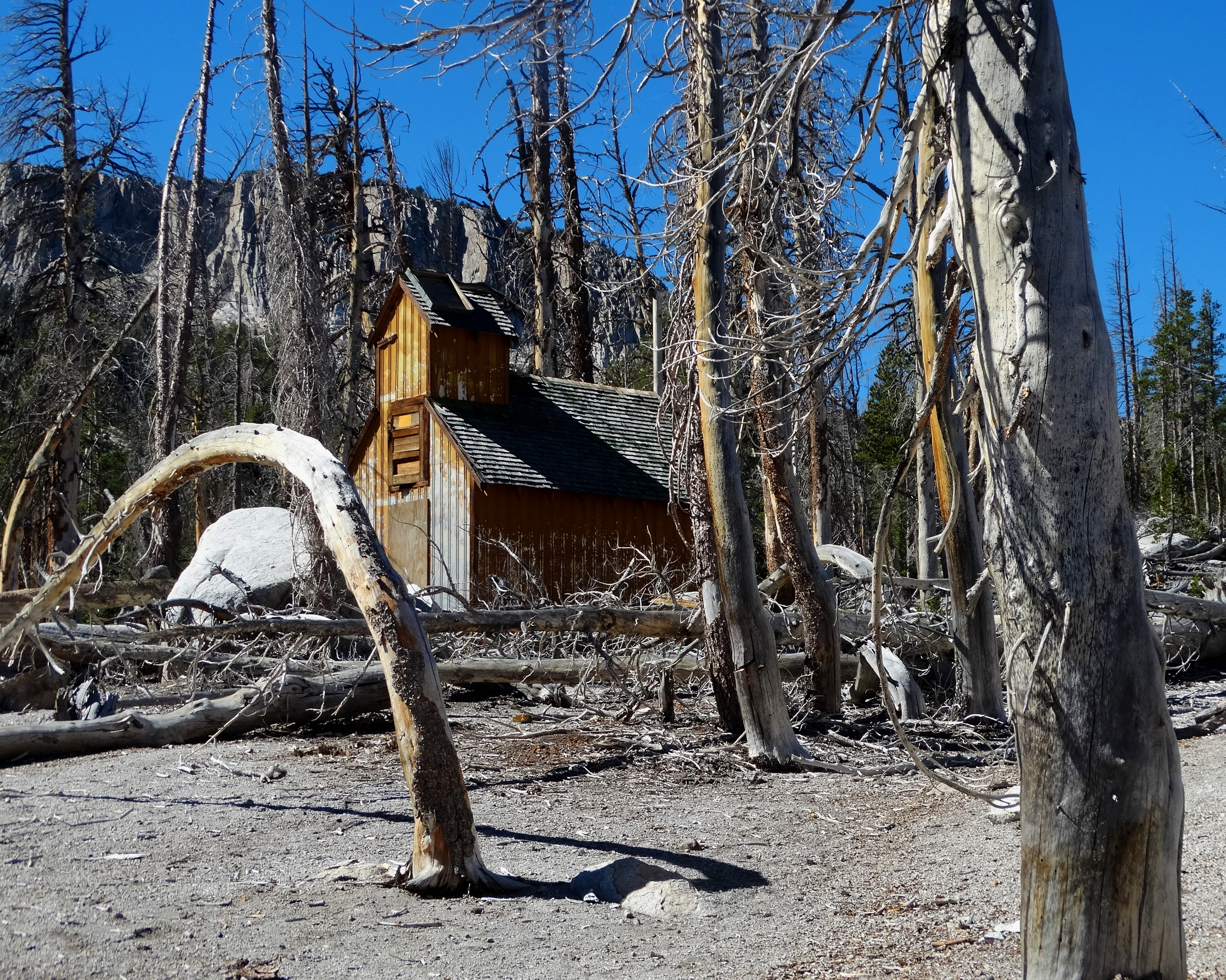
Overabundance of carbon dioxide in the soil from a natural underground volcanic source has killed a large area of trees

In 1999, CO_{2} measurements of the Horseshoe Lake area recorded concentrations of 2% in the visitor restroom, 25% in the snow cabin, and up to 60% in tree-wells within the dead-zone. In 1995, it was estimated that 1200 metric tons of CO_{2} were released per day. There is evidence that the rate of CO_{2} discharge has been declining, down to ~10 metric tons per day in 2010, with emissions peaking in 1991.

As of 2023, the concentration of carbon dioxide in soil gas at Mammoth Mountain was being monitored on a continuous, year-round basis at Horseshoe Lake, according to the U.S. Geological Survey, at a site where tree root suffocation was observed.

The CO_{2} originates from the degassing of magmatic carbonate metasedimentary rocks below the caldera. The uniformity in chemical and isotopic composition of the CO_{2} and accompanying gases at different locations around Mammoth Mountain indicates that there may be a large reservoir of gas deep below the mountain, from which gas escapes along faults to the surface. Measurements of helium emissions support the theory that the gases emitted in the tree kill area have the same source as those discharged from Mammoth Mountain Fumarole.

=== Ski patrol fatality incidents ===
In April 2006, three members of the Mammoth Mountain Ski Area ski patrol died while on duty when a fumarole caused a snow bridge to collapse under the patrollers. The 2005/2006 winter season delivered significant snow depth of 52 feet (16 m). As the ski patrollers assessed the fumarole for skier safety, the perimeter snow collapsed below two patrollers, James Juarez and John "Scotty" McAndrews, who fell 21 feet (6.4 m) into the bottom of the fumarole, exposing them to extremely high levels of carbon dioxide. A third patroller, Charles Walter Rosenthal, attempted to rescue them, entering the fumarole with a small bottle of oxygen for the fallen patrollers but none for himself. Another rescuer, Jeff Bridges, donned an oxygen mask and entered the fumarole but was also overcome. A third rescuer, Steve McCombs, entered with a rope and was able to rescue Bridges, but Juarez, McAndrews, and Rosenthal died of asphyxiation. A stone monument on the east side of Upper Road Runner serves as a memorial.

On February 14, 2025, two Mammoth Mountain ski patrollers, including Claire Murphy, were caught in an avalanche while attempting avalanche mitigation. The avalanche occurred due to an atmospheric river storm that caused around 6 feet of snow to fall within 36 hours. One patroller was recovered at the scene uninjured, while Claire Murphy was hospitalized with serious injuries and later died. An official statement on the Mammoth Mountain website read: "It is with the heaviest of hearts that we share the Mammoth Mountain Ski Patroller, Claire Murphy, who was hospitalized last Friday, passed away as a result of her injuries."

On December 26, 2025, two ski patrollers were caught in an avalanche, again while attempting avalanche mitigation. One patroller recovered from his injuries, but Cole Murphy, age 30, died from his injuries.

== Climate ==
Mammoth Mountain experiences a subarctic climate, with cold winters and significant snowfall.

Climate data for Mammoth Mountain 37.6279 N, 119.0338 W, Elevation: 10,541 ft (3,213 m) (1991–2020 normals)
Month	Jan	Feb	Mar	Apr	May	Jun	Jul	Aug	Sep	Oct	Nov	Dec	Year
Mean daily maximum °F (°C)	34.7 (1.5)	34.2 (1.2)	37.5 (3.1)	41.1 (5.1)	48.7 (9.3)	58.4 (14.7)	66.2 (19.0)	65.7 (18.7)	59.8 (15.4)	50.5 (10.3)	41.1 (5.1)	34.9 (1.6)	47.7 (8.8)
Daily mean °F (°C)	25.7 (−3.5)	24.2 (−4.3)	26.9 (−2.8)	30.2 (−1.0)	37.5 (3.1)	47.0 (8.3)	54.4 (12.4)	53.9 (12.2)	48.0 (8.9)	40.0 (4.4)	31.6 (−0.2)	25.9 (−3.4)	37.1 (2.8)
Mean daily minimum °F (°C)	16.7 (−8.5)	14.2 (−9.9)	16.3 (−8.7)	19.3 (−7.1)	26.4 (−3.1)	35.5 (1.9)	42.6 (5.9)	42.2 (5.7)	36.2 (2.3)	29.6 (−1.3)	22.0 (−5.6)	16.8 (−8.4)	26.5 (−3.1)
Average precipitation inches (mm)	11.46 (291)	9.41 (239)	8.46 (215)	4.96 (126)	3.11 (79)	0.72 (18)	0.50 (13)	0.39 (9.9)	0.46 (12)	2.62 (67)	3.99 (101)	9.68 (246)	55.76 (1,416.9)
Source: PRISM Climate Group

== Recreational use ==
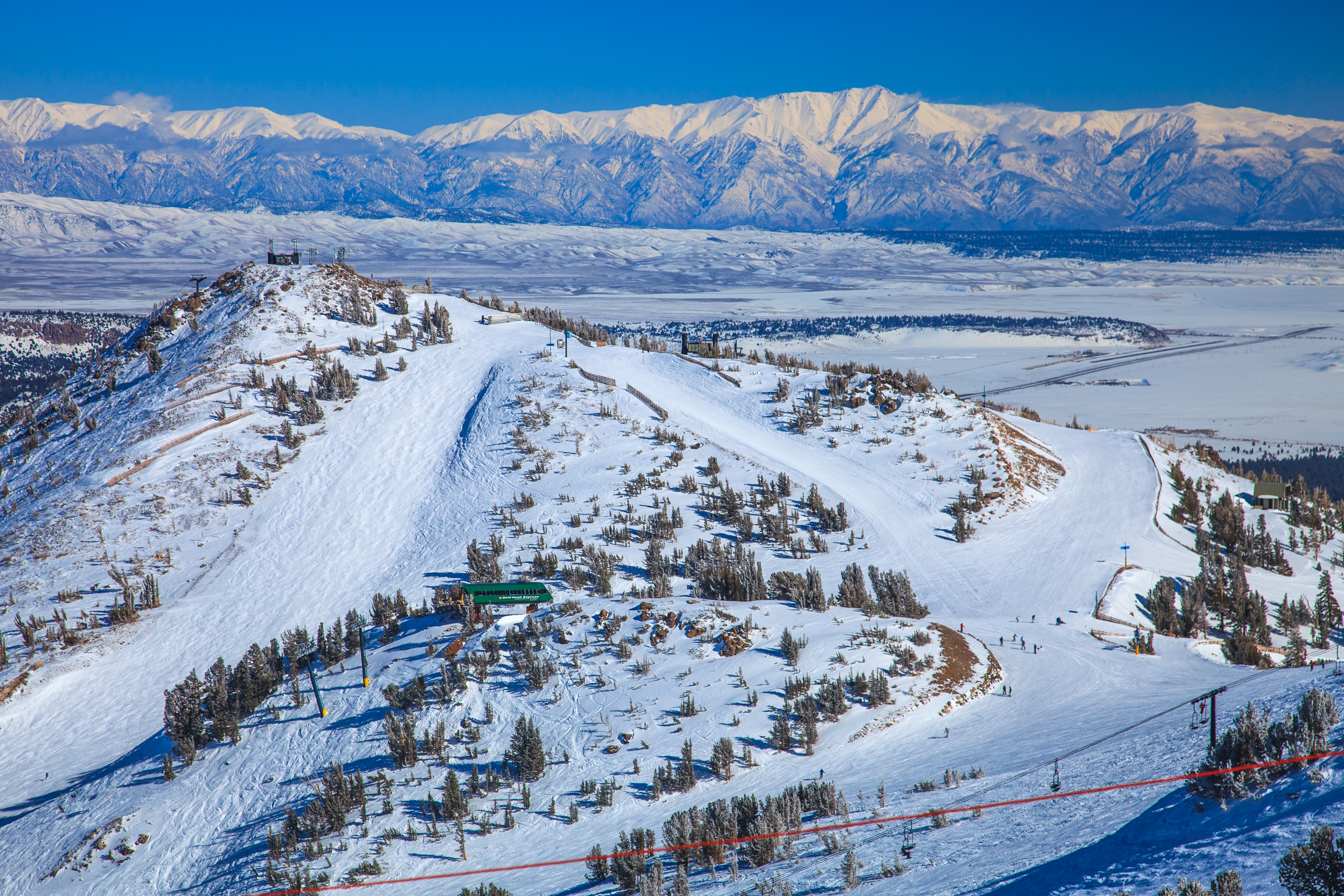
Ski runs

Mammoth Mountain is home to the Mammoth Mountain Ski Area, founded by Dave McCoy in 1953. Mammoth is a ski, snowboard, and snowmobile mountain during the winter months. Mammoth is the highest ski resort in California and is notable for the unusually large amount of snowfall it receives compared to other Eastern Sierra peaks—about 400 in (1,000 cm) annually and about 300 out of 365 days of sunshine—due to its location in a low gap in the Sierra crest. The ski area has more than 3,500 acres (1,420 ha) of skiable terrain, with 3,100 ft (940 m) of vertical serviced by 25 lifts. In the summer months the ski gondolas are used by mountain bikers and tourists who wish to get a summit view of Long Valley Caldera directly to the east and Sierra peaks to the west, south and north. To the south of the mountain, there are a number of lakes that serve as tourist attractions in the summer.
