= Gas composition =

The gas composition of any gas can be characterised by listing the pure substances it contains, and stating for each substance its proportion of the gas mixture's molecule count. Nitrogen N_{2} 78.084 Oxygen O_{2} 20.9476 Argon Ar 0.934 Carbon Dioxide CO_{2} 0.0314

== Gas composition of air ==
To give a familiar example, air has a composition of:

Pure Gas Name	Symbol	Percent by Volume
Nitrogen	N_{2}	78.084
Oxygen	O_{2}	20.9476
Argon	Ar	0.934
Carbon Dioxide	CO_{2}	0.0314
Neon	Ne	0.001818
Methane	CH_{4}	0.0002
Helium	He	0.000524
Krypton	Kr	0.000114
Hydrogen	H_{2}	0.00005
Xenon	Xe	0.0000087

Standard Dry Air is the agreed-upon gas composition for air from which all water vapour has been removed. There are various standards bodies which publish documents that define a dry air gas composition. Each standard provides a list of constituent concentrations, a gas density at standard conditions and a molar mass.

It is extremely unlikely that the actual composition of any specific sample of air will completely agree with any definition for standard dry air. While the various definitions for standard dry air all attempt to provide realistic information about the constituents of air, the definitions are important in and of themselves because they establish a standard which can be cited in legal contracts and publications documenting measurement calculation methodologies or equations of state.

The standards below are two examples of commonly used and cited publications that provide a composition for standard dry air:

- ISO TR 29922-2017 provides a definition for standard dry air which specifies an air molar mass of 28,965 46 ± 0,000 17 kg·kmol-1.
- GPA 2145:2009 is published by the Gas Processors Association. It provides a molar mass for air of 28.9625 g/mol, and provides a composition for standard dry air as a footnote.
