= Sigurdsson =

Sigurdsson is a Norwegian patronymic name of Old Norse origin, meaning son of Sigurd.

Sigurdsson may refer to:

- Haakon Sigurdsson (c. 937 – 995), Norwegian earl; ruler of Norway from 971 to 995
- Sumarlidi Sigurdsson (d. between 1014 and 1018), Earl of Orkney
- Einar Sigurdsson (d. 1020), Earl of Orkney
- Brusi Sigurdsson (d. between 1030 and 1035), Earl of Orkney
- Thorfinn Sigurdsson (1009 – 1064), Earl of Orkney
- Sigurd Sigurdsson Markusfostre (c. 1155 – 1163)
