= Lake Nyos =

Crater lake in the Northwest Region of Cameroon

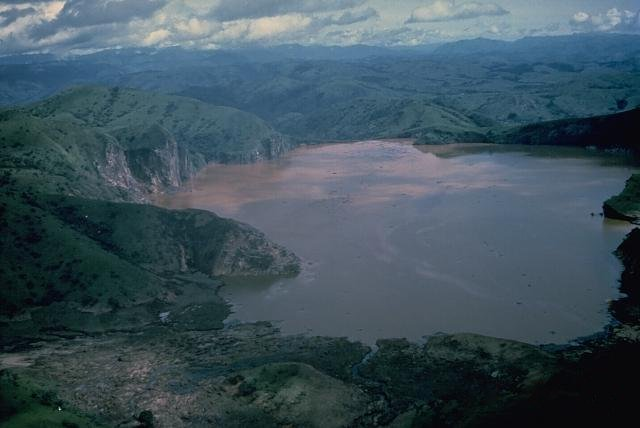
- Lake Nyos in 1986

- Location within Cameroon Location within Africa
- Location: Northwest Region, Cameroon
- Coordinates: 06°26′17″N 010°17′56″E
- Type: Meromictic, limnically active lake, volcanic crater lake
- Primary inflows: subaquatic source
- Basin countries: Cameroon
- Max. length: 2.0 km (1.2 mi)
- Max. width: 1.2 km (0.75 mi)
- Surface area: 1.58 km^{2} (390 acres)
- Average depth: 94.9 m (311 ft)
- Max. depth: 208 m (682 ft)
- Water volume: 0.15 km^{3} (120,000 acre⋅ft)
- Surface elevation: 1,091 m (3,579 ft)

Lake Nyos (/ˈniːoʊs/ NEE-ohs) is a crater lake in the Northwest Region of Cameroon, located about 315 km (196 mi) northwest of Yaoundé, the capital of Cameroon. Nyos is a deep lake high on the flank of an inactive volcano in the Oku volcanic plain along the Cameroon line of volcanic activity. A volcanic dam impounds the lake waters.

A pocket of magma lies beneath the lake and leaks carbon dioxide (CO_{2}) into the water, changing it into carbonic acid. Nyos is one of only three lakes known to be saturated with carbon dioxide in this way, and therefore prone to limnic eruptions (the others being Lake Monoun, also in Cameroon, and Lake Kivu in the Democratic Republic of Congo and Rwanda).

In 1986, possibly as the result of a landslide, Lake Nyos suddenly emitted a large cloud of CO_{2}, which suffocated 1,746 people and 3,500 livestock in nearby towns and villages, the most notable one being Chah, which was abandoned after the incident. The limnic eruption not only devastated human and livestock populations but also had a profound impact on the diverse aquatic life, including tilapia, crabs, snails, and frogs, leading to a significant loss of biodiversity in and around the lake.

Though not completely unprecedented, it was the first known large-scale asphyxiation caused by a natural event. To prevent a recurrence, a degassing tube that siphons water from the bottom layers to the top, allowing the carbon dioxide to leak in safe quantities, was installed in 2001. Two additional tubes were installed in 2011.

Today, the lake also poses a threat because its natural wall is weakening. A geological tremor could cause this natural levee to give way, allowing water to rush into downstream villages all the way into Nigeria and allowing large amounts of carbon dioxide to escape.

== Geography ==
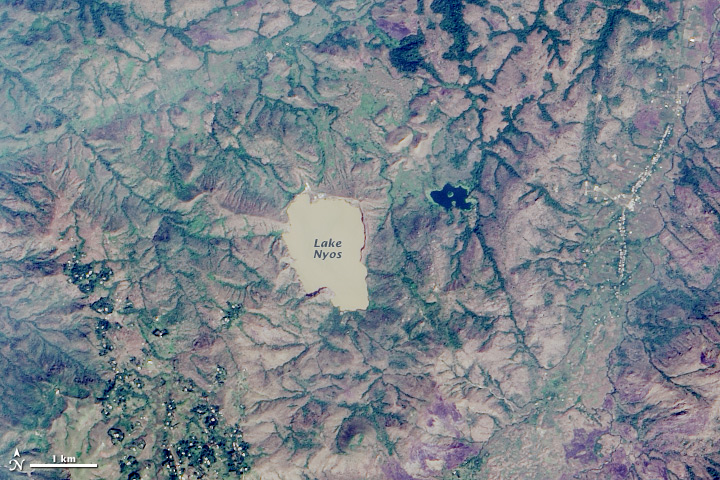
Lake and vicinity from Landsat 8, 2014

Lake Nyos lies within the Oku Volcanic Field, located near the northern boundary of the Cameroon Volcanic Line, a zone of volcanoes and other tectonic activity that extends southwest to the Mt. Cameroon stratovolcano. The field consists of volcanic maars and basaltic scoria cones.

== Formation and geologic history ==
Lake Nyos is located south of the dirt road from Wum, about 30 km (19 mi) to the west, to Nkambé in the east. Villages along the road in the vicinity of the lake include Cha, Nyos, Munji, Djingbe, and Subum. The lake is 50 km (31 mi) from the Nigerian border to the north, and lies on the northern slopes of the Massif du Mbam, drained by streams running north, then northwest, to the Katsina-Ala River in Nigeria which is part of the Benue River basin.

Lake Nyos fills a roughly circular maar in the Oku Volcanic Field, an explosion crater caused when a lava flow interacted violently with groundwater. The maar is believed to have formed in an eruption a maximum of 12,000 years ago, and is 1,800 m (5,900 ft) across and 208 m (682 ft) deep. The area has been volcanically active for millions of years—after South America and Africa were split apart by plate tectonics about 110 million years ago, West Africa also experienced rifting, although to a lesser degree. The rift is known as the Mbéré Rift Valley, and crustal extension has allowed magma to reach the surface along a line extending through Cameroon. Mount Cameroon also lies on this fault line. Lake Nyos is surrounded by old lava flows and pyroclastic deposits.

Although Nyos is situated within an extinct volcano, magma still exists beneath it. Approximately 80 kilometres (50 mi) directly below the lake resides a pool of magma, which releases carbon dioxide and other gases; the gases then travel upward through the earth. The fumes then dissolve in the natural springs encircling the lake, ultimately rising to the surface of the water and leaching into the lake. But with advances in technology now there is machinery placed at the bottom of the lake to remove the gases, so as to make the inhabitants of the area free from danger.

The lake waters are held in place by a natural dam composed of volcanic rock. At its narrowest point, the wall measures 40 metres (130 ft) high and 45 metres (148 ft) wide.

== Gas saturation ==
Lake Nyos is one of only three lakes in the world known to be saturated with carbon dioxide, the others being Lake Monoun (also in Cameroon) and Lake Kivu, which is split between the Democratic Republic of the Congo and Rwanda. A magma chamber beneath the region is the root cause of the saturation, with carbon dioxide seeping up into the lake. The lake is also thermally stratified; the lower the depth, the more CO_{2}-dense and colder the water becomes. Over long periods of time, carbon dioxide gas is absorbed in great amounts.

Usually, the lake is stable and the CO_{2} remains in the lower layers. Over time however, the water becomes supersaturated, and if an event such as an earthquake or landslide occurs, large amounts of CO_{2} will escape.

=== 1986 disaster ===
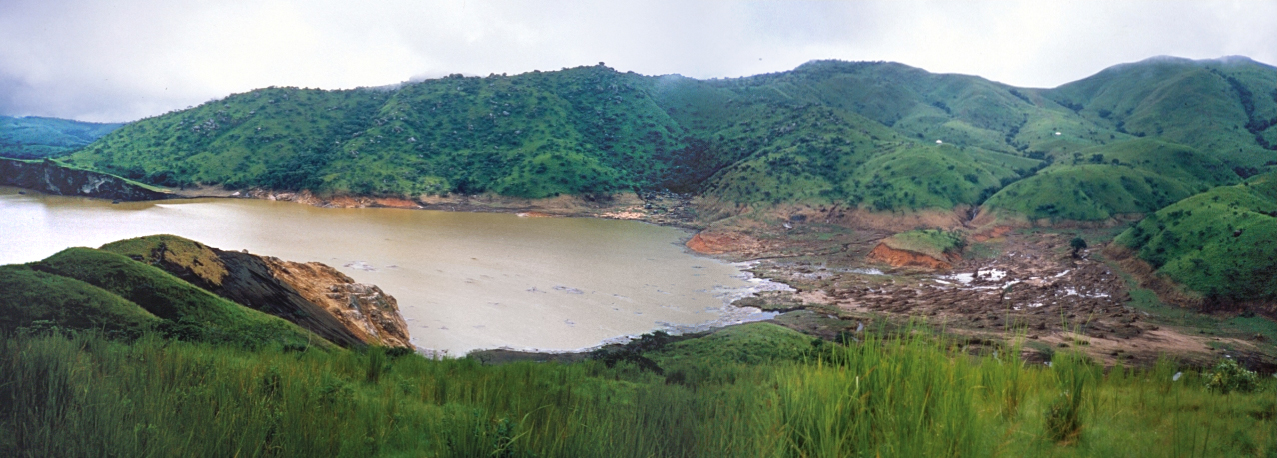
Lake Nyos as it appeared just over a week after the eruption, August 29, 1986

Although a sudden outgassing of CO_{2} had occurred at Lake Monoun in 1984, a similar threat from Lake Nyos was not anticipated. However, on August 21, 1986, a limnic eruption occurred at Lake Nyos, triggering the sudden release of about 100,000–300,000 tons (some sources state as much as 1.6 million tonnes) of CO_{2}. This gas cloud rose at nearly 100 kilometres per hour (62 mph) and spilled over the northern lip of the lake into a valley running roughly east–west from Cha to Subum. It then rushed down two valleys branching off to the north, displacing all of the air and suffocating 1,746 people within 25 kilometres (16 mi) of the lake, mostly rural villagers, as well as 3,500 livestock. The villages most affected were Cha, Nyos, and Subum.

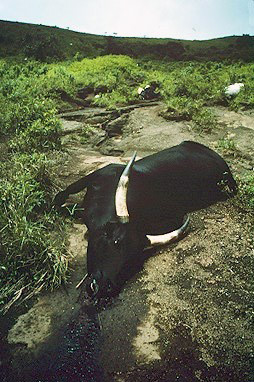
Cattle suffocated by carbon dioxide from Lake Nyos

Scientists concluded from evidence that a 100 m (330 ft) fountain of water and foam formed at the surface of the lake. The huge amount of water rising suddenly caused much turbulence in the water, spawning a wave of at least 25 metres (82 ft) that would scour the shore of one side.

It is not known what triggered the catastrophic outgassing. Most geologists suspect a landslide, but some believe that a small volcanic eruption may have occurred on the bed of the lake. A third possibility is that cool rainwater falling on one side of the lake triggered the overturn. Others still believe there was a small earthquake, but as witnesses did not report feeling any tremors on the morning of the disaster, this hypothesis is unlikely. Whatever the cause, the event resulted in the rapid mixing of the supersaturated deep water with the upper layers of the lake, where the reduced pressure allowed the stored CO_{2} to effervesce out of solution.

It is believed that about 1.2 cubic kilometres (0.29 cu mi) of gas was released. The normally blue waters of the lake turned a deep red after the outgassing, due to iron-rich water from the deep rising to the surface and being oxidised by the air. The level of the lake dropped by about a metre and a few old banana trees near the lake were knocked down.

=== Degassing ===
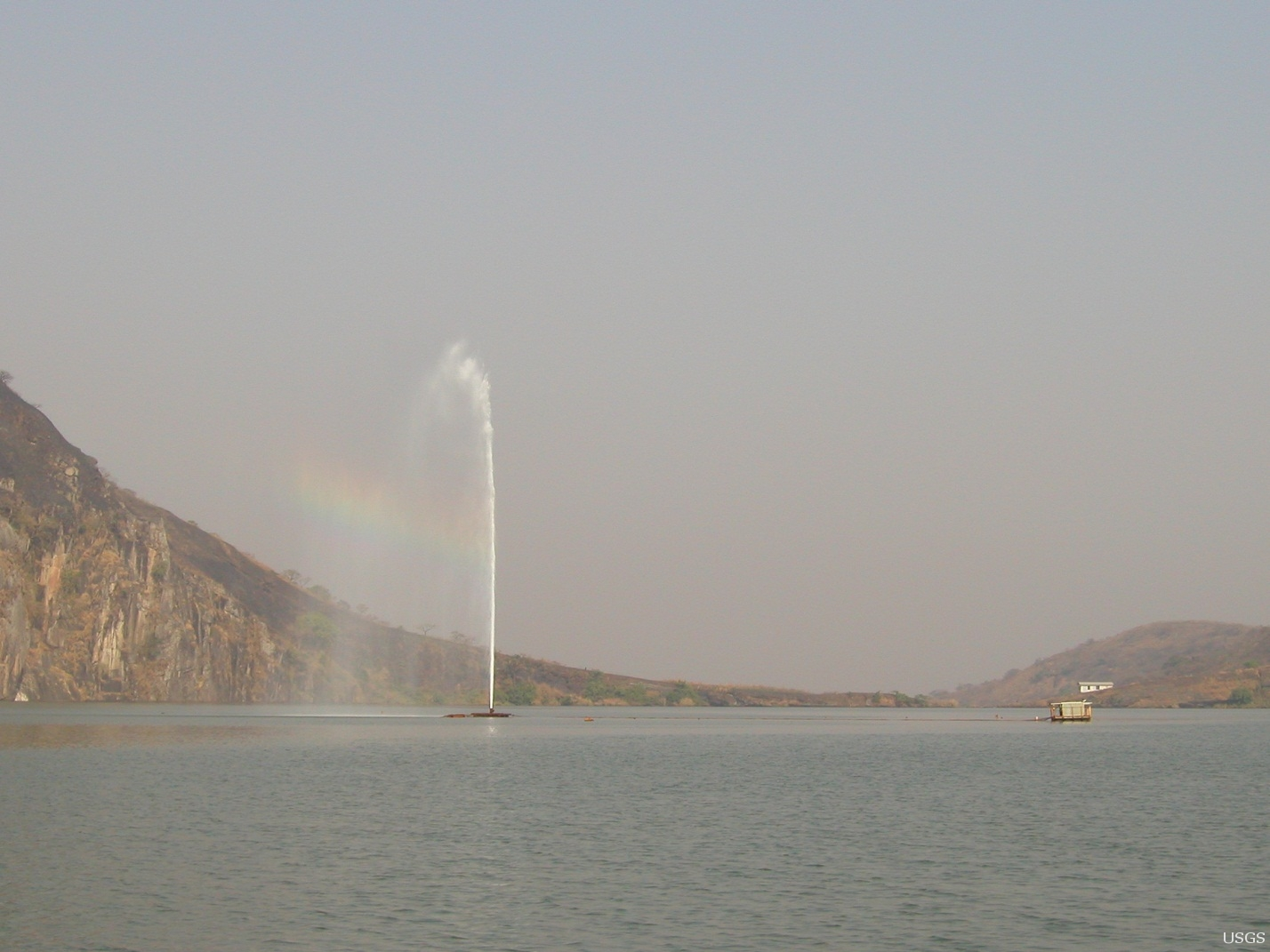
Artificial siphoning system

The scale of the 1986 disaster led to much study on how a recurrence could be prevented. Estimates of the rate of carbon dioxide entering the lake suggested that outgassings could occur every 10–30 years, though a recent study shows that release of water from the lake, caused by erosion of the natural barrier that keeps in the lake's water, could in turn reduce pressure on the lake's carbon dioxide and cause a gas escape much sooner.

Several researchers independently proposed the installation of degassing columns from rafts in the lake. These use a pump to initially lift water from the bottom of the lake, heavily saturated with CO_{2}, until the loss of pressure begins releasing the gas from the diphasic fluid, at which point the process becomes self-powered. In 1992 at Monoun, and in 1995 at Nyos, a French team directed by Michel Halbwachs demonstrated the feasibility of this approach. In 2001, the U.S. Office of Foreign Disaster Assistance funded a permanent installation at Nyos.

In 2011, two additional pipes were installed by Michel Halbwachs and his French-Cameroonian team to assure the complete degassing of Lake Nyos.

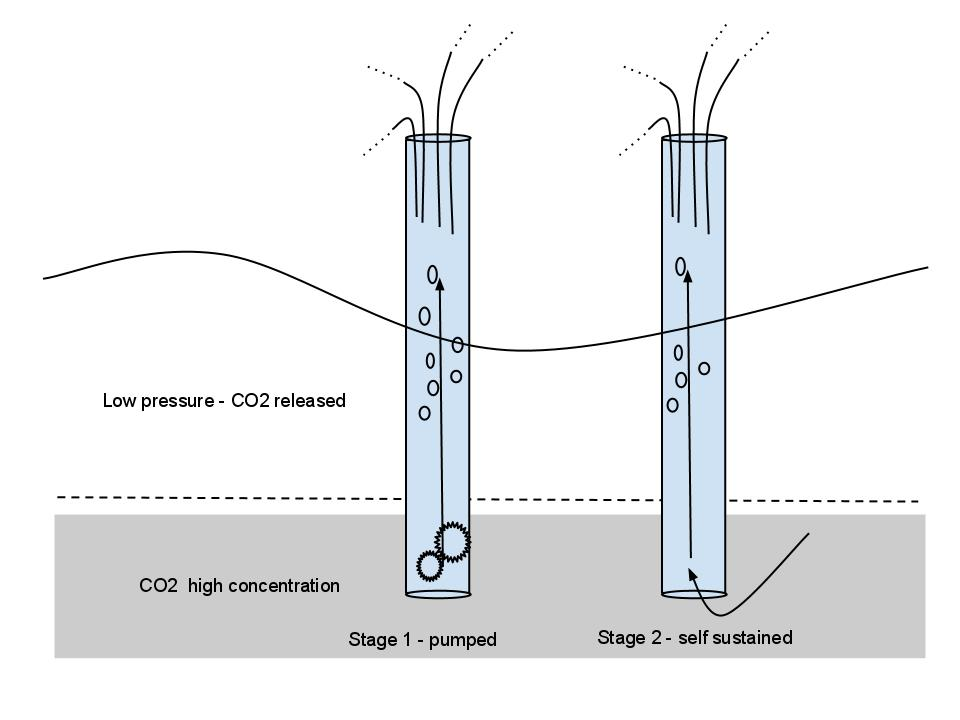
Degassing pump schematic

Following the disaster, scientists investigated other African lakes to see if a similar phenomenon could happen elsewhere. Lake Kivu, 2,000 times larger than Lake Nyos, was also found to be supersaturated, and geologists found evidence for outgassing events around the lake about every thousand years. The eruption of nearby Mount Nyiragongo in 2002 sent lava flowing into the lake, raising fears that a gas eruption could be triggered, but it was not, as the flow of lava stopped well before it got near the bottom layers of the lake, where the gas is maintained in solution by the water pressure.

== Weakening dam ==
In 2005, Isaac Njilah, a geologist at the University of Yaoundé, suggested that the natural dam of volcanic rock that keeps in the lake's waters could collapse in the near future. Erosion has worn the dam away, causing holes and pockets to develop in the dam's upper layer, and water already passes through the lower section. Meanwhile, landslides have reduced dam strength on the outside. Seismic activity caused by the lake's volcanic foundation could thus cause the lake wall to give way, resulting in up to 50 million m^{3} (1.8 billion ft^{3}) of water flooding downhill into areas of the Northwest Province and the Nigerian states of Taraba and Benue.

The Cameroonian government, speaking through Gregory Tanyi-Leke of the Institute of Mining and Geological Research, acknowledges the weakening wall, but denies that it presents any immediate threat. A United Nations team led by Olaf Van Duin and Nisa Nurmohamed of the Netherlands' Ministry of Transport and Public Works inspected the dam over three days in September 2005, and confirmed that the natural lip had weakened. Van Duin believed that the dam would breach within the next 10 to 20 years, a scenario that ultimately did not occur.

One possible means of averting such a catastrophe would be to strengthen the lake wall, though this would take much time and money. Engineers could also introduce a channel to allow excess water to drain; if the water level were lowered by about 20 m (66 ft), the pressure on the wall would be reduced significantly.

== Return of population ==
Despite the risks from carbon dioxide and collapse of the lake's retaining wall, the area is being resettled. Settlers cite the wish to return to ancestral lands (although some are newcomers) and the great fertility of the land as reasons for their return.

== In popular culture ==
- Nyos: Η τελετή της αθωότητας [Nyos: The ceremony of innocence] (2016), a novel by Basileios Drolias focusing on the Lake Nyos disaster.
- Stikvallei [Choke Valley] (2013), a non-fiction account of the Lake Nyos disaster by Frank Westerman.

== See also ==
- Carbon sequestration – Storing carbon in a carbon pool
- Limnic eruption – Type of natural disaster
- Limnology – Science of inland aquatic ecosystems
- Mazuku – Pocket of carbon dioxide–rich air that can be lethal
- Meromictic lake – Permanently stratified lake with layers of water that do not intermix
