= Zuilma Gabriela Sigurðardóttir =

Icelandic academic

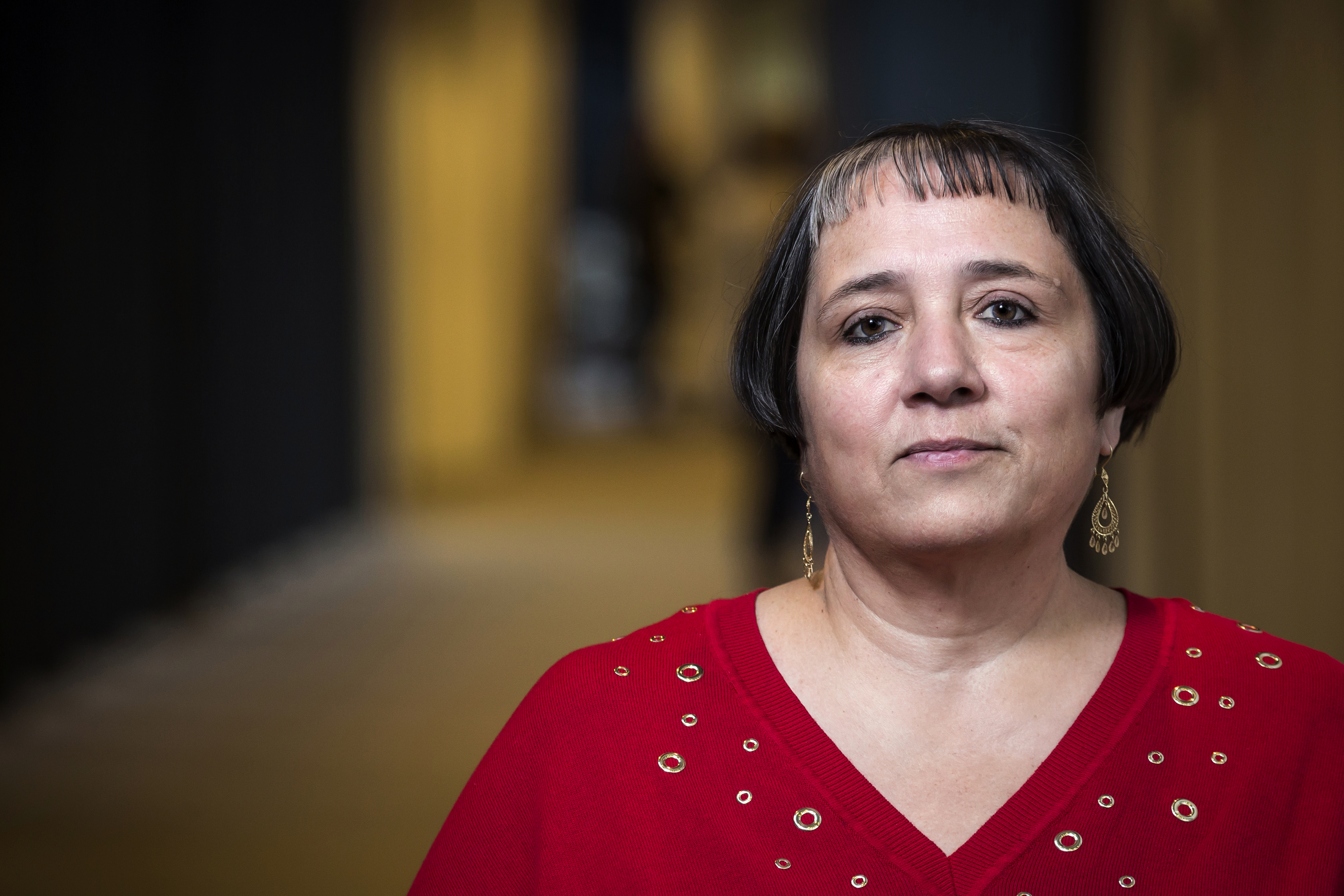
- Born: 1962 (age 63–64)
- Occupations: Professor in psychology at the University of Iceland and specialist in behaviour analysis

Zuilma Gabriela Sigurðardóttir (born 1962) is a professor in psychology at the University of Iceland, and specialist in behaviour analysis.

Zuilma Gabriela is originally from Mexico City, Mexico. She moved away from Mexico when she was 10 years old and, shortly thereafter, to Iceland. Before Zuilma became an Icelandic citizen, her name was Zuilma Gabriela Dragonné García Marín.

== Professional experience ==
Zuilma Gabriela completed a BA in psychology at the University of Iceland in the fall of 1985, an MA in Behaviour Analysis and Behaviour Therapy at Southern Illinois University in Carbondale, Illinois, in the United States in the spring of 1989, and a doctorate in Experimental Psychology from Northeastern University in Boston, Massachusetts, in 1992. Zuilma Gabriela became a licensed psychologist the same year. She worked as a psychologist the next seven years. She was at the Regional Office for the affairs of the Disabled in Reykjavik (1992 to 1996). There she was initially the director of a new community group home for the disabled. Later, she was a project manager and quality manager for independent living services along with consulting for the community residences in Reykjavik. She was director of staff education for the Regional Office and a psychologist for the Regional Office's clients and their families. Zuilma also worked part-time in the Women's Shelter (1992 to 1994) as a consultant on crisis counselling for children staying in the shelter.

In 1994, she started teaching part-time at the University of Iceland. In 1996, she took over the position of Department Head of the Psychology Department at the newly founded Reykjavik Educational Centre. There, in accordance with a new law on compulsory schools and specialised services in schools, she saw to formulating a policy on psychological services for compulsory schools in Reykjavik. She also held continuing education courses for teachers in many places and defined the job title “behaviour trainer” for teacher aids in elementary schools who had a BA in psychology. In addition, she played a part in establishing a course for teacher aids in compulsory schools. The course was set up in Borgarholtsskóli. She also imported, supervised the translation of, and started an organised offering of SOS-Help for parents course on behavior management. She continued working as head of the Psychology Department at the Reykjavik Educational Centre through the fall of 1999. She then began working full-time as an assistant professor in the Psychology Department of the University of Iceland, which was then under the Faculty of Social Sciences. She held various positions of confidentiality in the Faculty of Social Sciences. She chaired the Psychology Department from 2005 to 2007, sat on the University Forum, was on the Admissions Committee of the doctoral programme in the Faculty of Social Sciences and sat on several of the Rector's committees. Today, Zuilma Gabriela is a professor in the University of Iceland's Faculty of Psychology in the School of Health Sciences and is also director of the Behaviour Analysis Laboratory. Zuilma Gabriela has operated a psychology private practice since 1992, along with her other work. In addition, she provides psychology services to Spanish-speaking people.

== Research ==
Zuilma Gabriela's research has been in the broad field of behaviour analysis. Internationally, her most prominent research is in the field of stimulus equivalence. In applied behaviour analysis, she has emphasised research on interventions in children's behavioural and academic problems. In addition, Zuilma Gabriela has focused on the safety of children in shopping carts, as well as speech rehabilitation with operant conditioning for those coping with aphasia after a stroke. She has also researched safety and behaviour management in workplaces as well as the quality of life of parents with handicapped children. Assessment of the effectiveness of interventions with single subject experimental designs has been a main focus of her research in applied behaviour analysis. She has carried out most of them onsite with great benefit for society.

Zuilma Gabriela is the only professor in behaviour analysis in Iceland. She has laid the foundation for the growth and development of behaviour analysis as a scientific field in the country.

== Other work and projects ==
She also gave the keynote speech in 2016 in Bulgaria at the first conference there on behaviour analysis.

Zuilma was the president of the European Association for Behavior Analysis from 2015 to 2017. She was then on the EABA board of directors.

Zuilma has served on the review board of the European Journal of Behavior Analysis since 2000 and as one of the journal's Action Editors since 2015. She has also been Associate Editor of the Journal of Behavioral Education since 2016.

Zuilma Gabriela has been an Erasmus exchange teacher each year since the fall of 2015 in the Faculty of Psychology at the University of Latvia in Riga.

Zuilma Gabriela has also taught in the Board Certified Behavior Analysts’ (BCBA) programmes in Riga, launched the Association for Behaviour Analysis in Latvia and the Baltic Association for Behaviour Analysis.

== Personal life ==
Zuilma's mother is Thalía María Jósefsdóttir (1935) (previously Thalía María García Marin Sariñana), and her stepfather is Sigurður Finnbogason (1928–2014). Zuilma has two children.

== Scholarly articles ==
- Sigurðardóttir, Z. G., Mackay, H. A., and Green, G. (2012). Stimulus Equivalence, Generalization, and Contextual Stimulus Control in Verbal Classes. The Analysis of Verbal Behavior, 28()1, 3-29.
- Sigurdardottir, Z. G., Green, G., and Saunders, R. R. (1990). Equivalence classes generated by sequence training. Journal of the Experimental Analysis of Behavior, 53(1), 47–63.
- Sigurðardóttir, Z. G. and Sighvatsson, M. B. (2007). Operant conditioning and errorless learning procedures in the treatment of chronic aphasia. International Journal of Psychology, 41(6).
- Valdimarsdóttir, H., Halldórsdóttir, L. Ý., and Sigurdardottir, Z. G. (2010). Increasing the variety of foods consumed by picky eater: Generalization of effects across caregivers and settings. Journal of Applied Behavior Analysis, 43(1), 101–105.
- Guðmundsdóttir, K., Ala'i-Rosales, S., and Sigurðardóttir, Z. G. (2019). Extending Caregiver Training Via Telecommunication for Rural Icelandic Children With Autism. Rural Special Education Quarterly, July 19, 2018.
