= Lake Monoun =

Lake in West Province, Cameroon

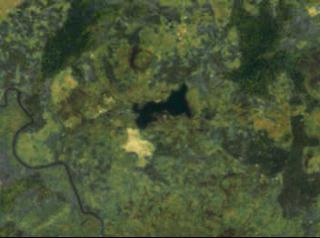
- A Landsat 7 satellite image

- Location within Cameroon Location within Africa
- Coordinates: 5°35′N 10°35′E
- Type: Meromictic, limnically active lake, volcanic crater lake
- Basin countries: Cameroon
- Max. length: 1.6 km (0.99 mi)
- Max. width: 0.7 km (0.43 mi)
- Surface area: 0.31 km^{2} (0.12 sq mi)
- Max. depth: 99 m (325 ft)

Lake Monoun is a crater lake (maar) in West Province, Cameroon, that lies in the Oku Volcanic Field. On 15 August 1984, a limnic eruption occurred at the lake, which resulted in the release of a large amount of carbon dioxide (CO_{2}) that killed 37 people. At first, the deaths remained unexplained, and causes such as terrorism were suspected. Further investigation and a similar event two years later at Lake Nyos led to the currently accepted explanation.

== Disaster ==
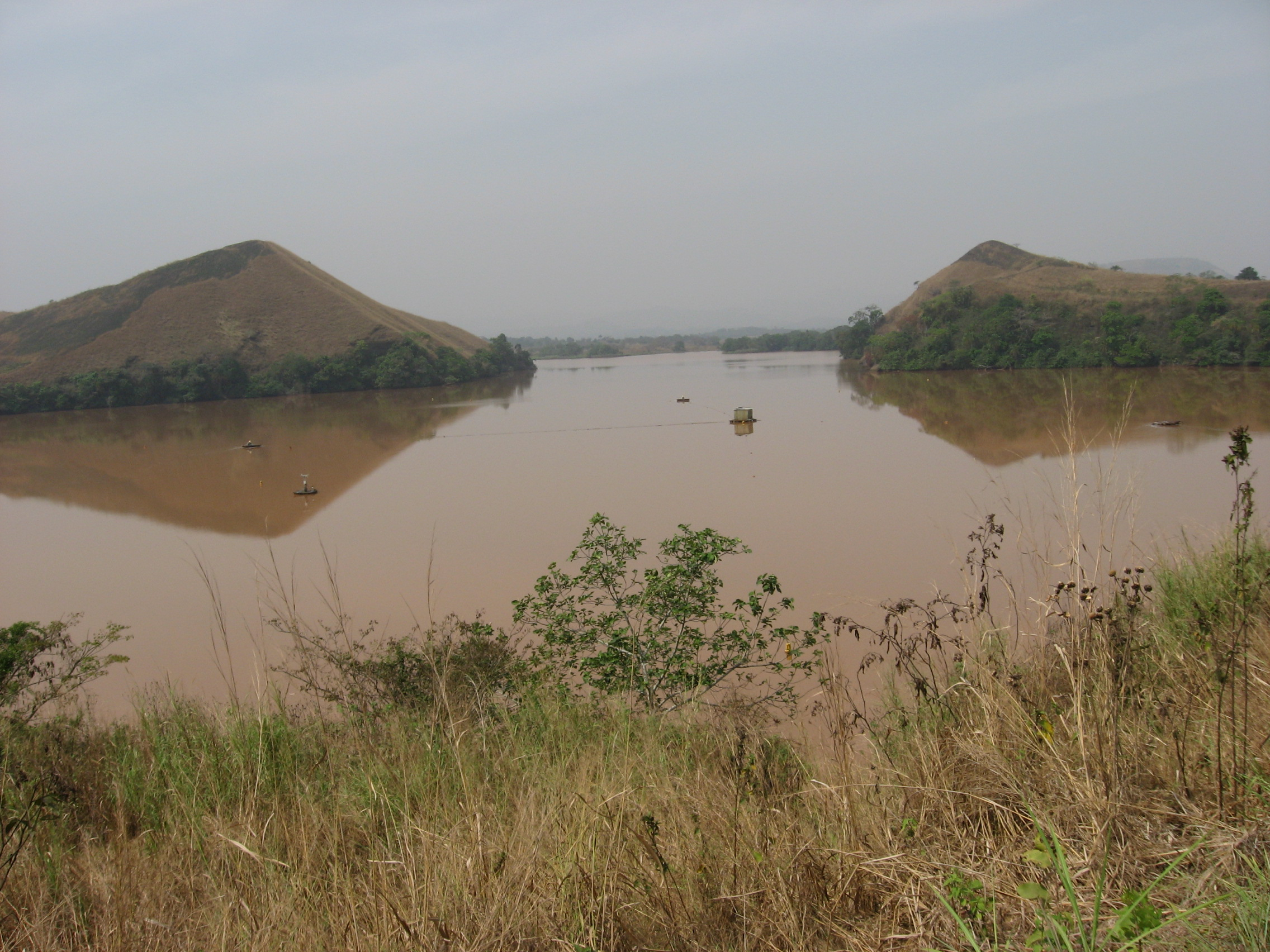
Lake Monoun located in the West Region of Cameroon

Several people reported hearing a loud noise on 15 August 1984, around 22:30. A gas cloud reportedly emanated from a crater in the eastern part of the lake. The resulting deaths of 37 residents in a low-lying area are believed to have occurred between 03:00 and dawn. The victims were said to have skin burns, which reports later clarified as "skin damage" such as discoloration. Survivors reported that the whitish, smoke-like cloud smelled bitter and acidic. Vegetation was flattened around the eastern part of the lake, probably by a large wave of up to 5 m (16 ft) height.

Although Lake Monoun is near the center of a volcanic field that includes at least 34 recent craters, the subsequent investigation found that the event was not caused by an eruption or sudden ejection of volcanic gas from the lake. Rather, emission of carbon dioxide in a limnic eruption is thought to be to blame. The cloud's smell and skin damage to victims were not fully explained. Some theories attribute the skin problems to a combination of preexisting conditions and routine postmortem effects like livor mortis; another medical interpretation says that lowered metabolic rates induced a severely restricted circulation in capillary vessels of the skin, resulting in necrosis, although there is no clear consensus.

Among the victims were some of the riders in a truck carrying twelve people. The truck's engine stopped working as it became starved of oxygen, and the people inside the truck got out and were killed. Two people sitting on top of the truck survived, because their elevated position allowed them to breathe – carbon dioxide is heavier than air (oxygen and nitrogen) which causes it to stay close to the ground.

Two years later, on 21 August 1986, a similar and much more deadly event occurred at Lake Nyos, about 100 km (62 mi) north-northwest, killing 1,746 people and more than 3,000 livestock. Along with Lake Nyos and Lake Kivu, Lake Monoun is one of three lakes in the world known to have high concentrations of gas dissolved deep below the surface and which have the right conditions for a limnic eruption.

== Degassing ==
In March and April 1992 preliminary test were conducted at Lake Monoun using the gas lift method as known in the petroleum industry. Initially a pump (or preferably a compressed gas injection) is needed to pull water from the bottom, but as carbon dioxide begins to come out of solution it creates buoyancy in the water in the pipes, allowing a self-sustaining process without the need for external energy supply.

Due to the fact that the project had little funding and needed to be done by hand, the solution was the use of high-density polyethylene (HDPE) pipes. The material has a density of 0.961 kg/L which means an almost neutral buoyancy in water. The HDPE plastic is flexible, not brittle, and resistive to chemical and weathering alteration as proven material for natural gas distribution networks. The pipe could be easily soldered electrically in the field from standard 6 m (20 ft) segments, and deployed with just the help of rubber boats and floats. With some ballast, the pipe hangs freely from an anchored raft like a pendulum. Unfortunately, the CO_{2}-rich, oxygen-depleted water from the depth is a challenge for steel fittings: Corrosion occurred and formed siderite which removed iron from the steel.

In February 2003, a venting pipe was inserted into the lake, in an effort to prevent the disaster from recurring. In the initial degassing phase, an 8 m (26 ft) fountain developed from the water tapped at 73 m (240 ft) depth. However, a study found in 2005 that gas was not being removed from the lake quickly enough to ensure that the disaster could never happen again. It was recommended to lower the inlet of the existing pipe down to 97 m (318 ft) and the addition of a second pipe in order to release more carbon dioxide. On the other hand, the deep lake water is rich in iron(II) ions, which after a while transforms into limonite. As the lake is a fishing ground for local villagers, the effect of a higher iron intake rate in the upper water layer on fishlife needed consideration before scaling up the degassing rate.

In December 2013, the degassing pipe was upgraded with a small solar-power driven rotary pump, since it had lost its self-lift capability due to the bubbling effect in the riser as a significant amount of CO_{2} had been removed from the bottom layers. The new system is able to lift c. 100 m³ of bottom water to the surface per day. That degassing capability is unfortunately less than the natural inflow of CO_{2}-rich water, therefore two more of these solar pumps are needed to avoid a long-term build up of higher and dangerous levels of CO_{2} in the stratified water levels.

== See also ==
- Mazuku
- Meromictic lake
- Lake Kivu
- Limnic eruption
