= Limnic eruption =

Type of natural disaster

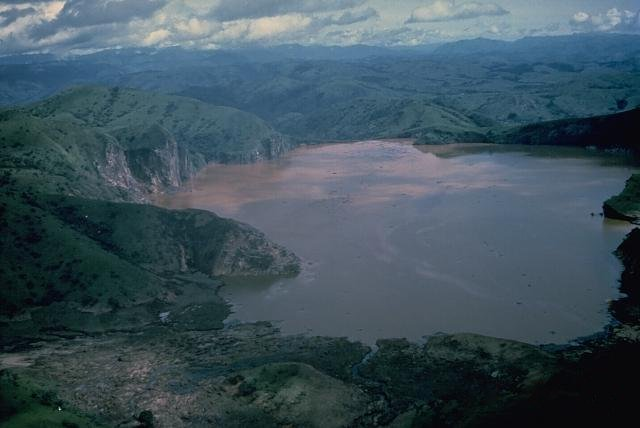
Lake Nyos, the site of a limnic eruption in 1986

A limnic eruption, also known as a lake overturn, is an extremely rare type of natural hazard in which dissolved carbon dioxide (CO_{2}) suddenly erupts from deep lake waters, forming a gas cloud capable of asphyxiating wildlife, livestock, and humans. Scientists believe that earthquakes, volcanic activity, and other explosive events can serve as triggers for limnic eruptions as the rising CO_{2} ejects water from the lake. Lakes in which such activity occurs are referred to as limnically active lakes or exploding lakes. Some features of limnically active lakes include:

- CO_{2}-saturated incoming water,
- A cool lake bottom indicating an absence of direct volcanic heat in the lake waters,
- An upper and lower thermal layer with differing CO_{2} saturations,
- Proximity to areas with volcanic activity.

Investigations of the Lake Monoun and Lake Nyos casualties led scientists to classify limnic eruptions as a distinct type of hazard event, even though they can be indirectly linked to volcanic eruptions.

== Historical occurrences ==
Locations of the two recorded limnic eruptions in modern history, Cameroon

Due to the largely invisible nature of the underlying cause (CO_{2} gas) behind limnic eruptions, it is difficult to determine to what extent, and when, eruptions have occurred in the past. The Roman historian Plutarch reports that in 406 BC, Lake Albano surged over the surrounding hills, despite there being no rain nor tributaries flowing into the lake to account for the rise in water level. The ensuing flood destroyed fields and vineyards before eventually pouring into the sea. This event is thought to have been caused by volcanic gases, trapped in sediment at the bottom of the lake and gradually building up until suddenly releasing, causing the water to overflow.

In recent history, this phenomenon has been observed twice. The first recorded limnic eruption occurred in Cameroon at Lake Monoun in 1984, causing asphyxiation and death of 37 people living nearby. A second, deadlier eruption happened at neighboring Lake Nyos in 1986, releasing over 80 million m^{3} of CO_{2}, killing around 1,700 people and 3,000 livestock, again by asphyxiation.

A third lake, the much larger Lake Kivu, rests on the border between the Democratic Republic of the Congo and Rwanda, and contains massive amounts of dissolved CO_{2}. Sediment samples taken from the lake showed an event caused living creatures in the lake to go extinct around every 1,000 years, and caused nearby vegetation to be swept back into the lake. Limnic eruptions can be detected and quantified on a CO_{2} concentration scale by taking air samples of the affected region.

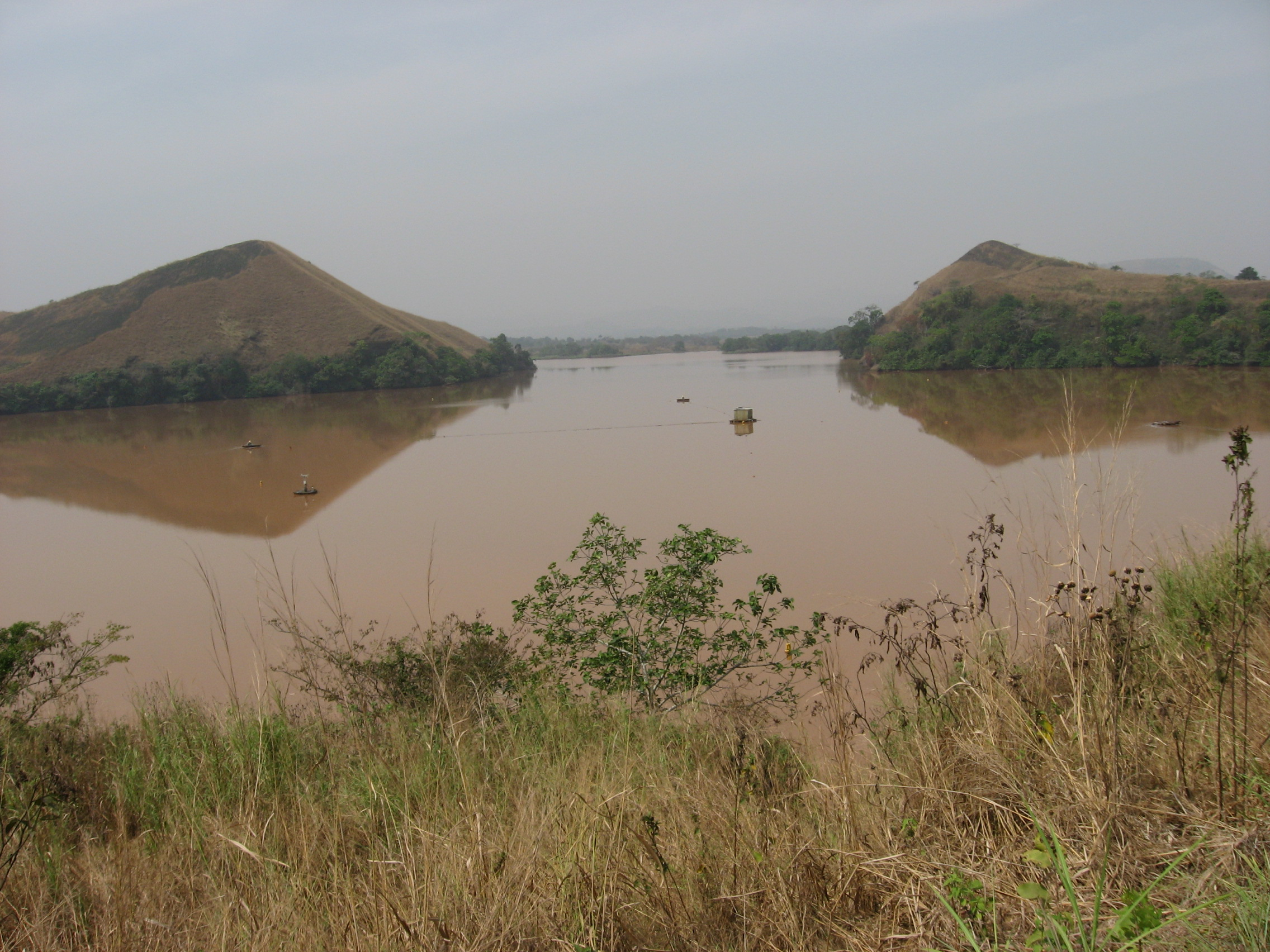
Lake Monoun situated in the West Region of Cameroon

The Messel pit fossil deposits of Messel, Germany, show evidence of a limnic eruption there in the early Eocene. Among the victims are perfectly preserved insects, frogs, turtles, crocodiles, birds, anteaters, insectivores, early primates, and paleotheres.

== Causes ==
Diagram describing the occurrence of limnic eruption

For a lake to undergo a limnic eruption, the water must be nearly saturated with gas. CO_{2} was the primary component in the two observed cases, Lake Nyos and Lake Monoun. In Lake Kivu's case, scientists, including lake physicist Alfred Johny Wüest, were also concerned about the concentrations of methane. CO_{2} may originate from volcanic gas emitted from under the lake, or from decomposition of organic material.

Before a lake becomes saturated, it behaves like an unopened carbonated soft drink: the CO_{2} is dissolved in the water. In both lakes and soft drinks, CO_{2} dissolves much more readily at higher pressure due to Henry's law. When the pressure is released, the CO_{2} comes out of solution as bubbles of gas, which rise to the surface. CO_{2} also dissolves more readily in cooler water, so very deep lakes can dissolve very large amounts of CO_{2} since pressure increases, and temperature decreases, with depth. A small increase in water temperature can lead to the release of a large amount of CO_{2}.

Once a lake is saturated, it is very unstable but a trigger is needed to actually set off an eruption. In the case of the 1986 Lake Nyos eruption, landslides were the suspected triggers, but a volcanic eruption, an earthquake, or even wind and rain storms can be potential triggers. Limnic eruptions can also be caused by gradual gas saturation at specific depths triggering spontaneous gas development. Regardless of cause, the trigger pushes gas-saturated water higher in the lake, where the reduced pressure is insufficient to keep gas in solution. The buoyancy from the resulting bubbles lifts the water even higher, releasing yet more bubbles. This process forms a column of gas, at which point the water at the bottom is pulled up by suction, and it too loses CO_{2} in a runaway process. This eruption discharges the gas into the air and can displace enough water to form a tsunami.

Limnic eruptions are exceptionally rare for several reasons. First, a CO_{2} source must exist; regions with volcanic activity are most at risk. Second, the vast majority of lakes are holomictic (their layers mix regularly), preventing a buildup of dissolved gases. Only meromictic lakes are stratified, allowing CO_{2} to remain dissolved. It is estimated only one meromictic lake exists for every 1,000 holomictic lakes. Finally, a lake must be very deep in order to have sufficiently pressurized water that can dissolve large amounts of CO_{2}.

== Consequences ==
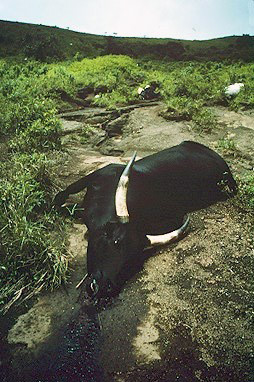
Bovine killed by the 1986 limnic eruption at Lake Nyos

Once an eruption occurs, a large CO_{2} cloud forms above the lake and expands to the surrounding region. Because CO_{2} is denser than air, it has a tendency to sink to the ground, forcing out breathable air and causing asphyxiation. CO_{2} can make human bodily fluids highly acidic and potentially cause CO_{2} poisoning. As victims gasp for air, they actually accelerate asphyxia by inhaling CO_{2}.

At Lake Nyos, the gas cloud descended into a nearby village where it settled, killing nearly everyone; casualties as far as 25 km (16 mi) were reported. A change in skin color on some bodies led scientists to hypothesize the gas cloud may have contained dissolved acid such as hydrogen chloride, though this hypothesis is disputed. Many victims were found with blisters on their skin, thought to have been caused by pressure ulcers, which were likely caused by low blood oxygen levels in those asphyxiated by carbon dioxide. Nearby vegetation was largely unaffected, except any growing immediately adjacent to the lake. There, vegetation was damaged or destroyed by a 24-metre-high (79 ft) tsunami caused by the violent eruption.

== Degassing ==
Efforts are underway to develop a solution for removing the gas from these lakes and to prevent a build-up which could lead to another disaster. A team led by French scientist Michel Halbwachs began experimenting at Lake Monoun and Lake Nyos in 1990 using siphons to degas the waters of these lakes in a controlled manner. The team positioned a pipe vertically in the lake with its upper end above the water surface. Water saturated with CO_{2} enters the bottom of the pipe and rises to the top. The lower pressure at the surface allows the gas to come out of solution. Only a small amount of water must be mechanically pumped initially through the pipe to start the flow. As saturated water rises, the CO_{2} comes out of solution and forms bubbles. The natural buoyancy of the bubbles draws the water up the pipe at high velocity resulting in a fountain at the surface. The degassifying water acts like a pump, drawing more water into the bottom of the pipe, and creating a self-sustaining flow. This is the same process which leads to a natural eruption, but in this case it is controlled by the size of the pipe.

Each pipe has a limited pumping capacity and several would be required for both Lake Monoun and Lake Nyos to degas a significant fraction of the deep lake water and render the lakes safe. The deep lake waters are slightly acidic due to the dissolved CO_{2} which causes corrosion to the pipes and electronics, necessitating ongoing maintenance. There is some concern that CO_{2} from the pipes could settle on the surface of the lake forming a thin layer of unbreathable air and thus potentially causing problems for wildlife.

In January 2001, a single pipe was installed by the French-Cameroonian team on Lake Nyos, and two more pipes were installed in 2011 with funding support from the United Nations Development Programme. A pipe was installed at Lake Monoun in 2003 and two more were added in 2006. These three pipes are thought to be sufficient to prevent an increase in CO_{2} levels, removing approximately the same amount of gas that naturally enters at the lake bed. In January 2003, an 18-month project was approved to fully degas Lake Monoun, and the lake has since been rendered safe.

There is some evidence that Lake Michigan in the United States spontaneously degasses on a much smaller scale each fall.

== Lake Kivu risks ==
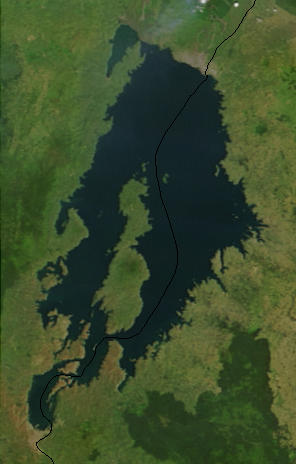
Satellite image of Lake Kivu in 2003

Lake Kivu is not only about 1,700 times larger than Lake Nyos, but is also located in a far more densely populated area, with over two million people living along its shores. The part within the Democratic Republic of the Congo is a site of active armed conflict and low state capacity for the DRC government, which impedes both studies and any subsequent mitigating actions. Lake Kivu has not reached a high level of CO_{2} saturation yet; if the water were to become heavily saturated, a limnic eruption would pose a great risk to human and animal life, potentially killing millions.

Two significant changes in Lake Kivu's physical state have brought attention to a possible limnic eruption: the high rates of methane dissociation and a rising surface temperature. Research investigating historical and present-day temperatures show Lake Kivu's surface temperature is increasing by about 0.12 °C per decade. Lake Kivu is in close proximity to potential triggers: Mount Nyiragongo (an active volcano which erupted in January 2002 and May 2021), an active earthquake zone, and other active volcanoes.

While the lake could be degassed in a manner similar to Lake Monoun and Lake Nyos, due to the size of Lake Kivu and the volume of gas it contains, such an operation would be expensive, running into the millions of dollars. A scheme initiated in 2010 to use methane trapped in the lake as a fuel source to generate electricity in Rwanda has led to a degree of CO_{2} degassing. During the procedure for extracting the flammable methane gas used to fuel power stations on the shore, some CO_{2} is removed in a process known as catalyst scrubbing. It is unclear whether enough gas will be removed to eliminate the danger of a limnic eruption at Lake Kivu.

== See also ==
- Cold-water geyser
- Mazuku
- Tsunamis in lakes
