= Lake Nyos disaster =

1986 limnic eruption in Cameroon

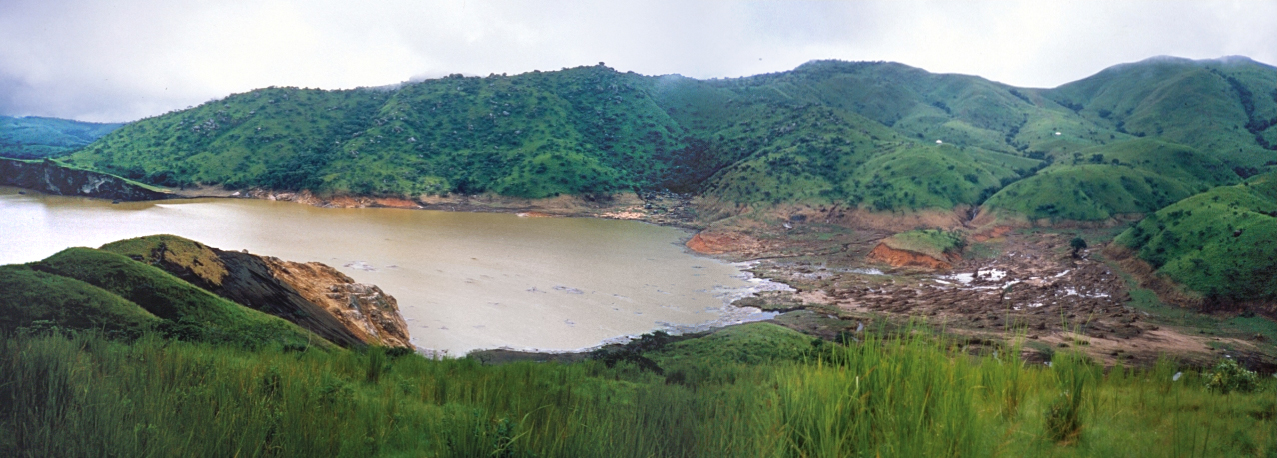
- Lake Nyos as it appeared eight days after the eruption

- Location within Cameroon
- Date: 21 August 1986
- Location: Lake Nyos, Cameroon; 6.44°N 10.30°E
- Type: Limnic eruption
- Deaths: 1,746
- Injuries: 845

On 21 August 1986, a limnic eruption at Lake Nyos in northwestern Cameroon killed 1,746 people and 3,500 livestock.

The eruption triggered the sudden release of about 100,000–300,000 tons of carbon dioxide (CO_{2}). The gas cloud initially rose at nearly 100 km/h (62 mph; 28 m/s) and then, being heavier than air, descended onto nearby villages, suffocating people and livestock within 25 km (16 miles) of the lake.

A degassing system has since been installed at the lake, with the aim of reducing the concentration of CO_{2} in the waters and therefore the risk of further eruptions. Along with the Lake Monoun disaster two years earlier, it is one of only two recorded limnic eruptions in modern human history.

== Eruption and gas release ==
What triggered the catastrophic outgassing is not known. Most geologists suspect a landslide, but some believe that a small volcanic eruption may have occurred on the bed of the lake. A third possibility is that cool rainwater falling on one side of the lake triggered the overturn. Other scientists offer that no external action is needed to start this event.

The horizontal layering of the water column is due to the differential diffusion of CO2 and heat but, contrary to salt (which stabilises the thermohaline stratification of the oceans), carbon dioxide has a solubility that is limited by temperature, making the stratification intrinsically unstable. Thus, there is even no need of an external trigger (landslide, earthquake or heavy rain) to upset the stratification of the lake. Once CO2 bubbles nucleate within a saturated layer of the lake water, they rise and grow, attracting in their wake deeper water available for ex-solution, feeding the chain reaction process : the entire lake overturns through an ascending column of rising and expanding bubbles.

The event resulted in the supersaturated deep water rapidly mixing with the upper layers of the lake, where the reduced pressure allowed the stored CO_{2} to effervesce out of solution.

It is believed that about 1.2 cubic kilometres (4.2×10^{10} cu ft) of gas was released. The normally blue waters of the lake turned a deep red after the outgassing, due to iron‑rich water from the deep rising to the surface and being oxidised by the air. The level of the lake dropped by about a metre and trees near the lake were knocked down.

Scientists concluded from evidence that a 100 metres (330 ft) column of water and foam formed at the surface of the lake, spawning a wave of at least 25 metres (82 ft) that swept the shore on one side.

Since carbon dioxide is 50% more dense than air, the cloud hugged the ground and moved down the valleys, where there were various villages. The mass was about 50 metres (160 ft) thick, and travelled downward at 20–50 kilometres per hour (12–31 mph; 5.6–13.9 m/s). For roughly 23 kilometres (14 mi), the gas cloud was concentrated enough to suffocate many people in their sleep in the villages of Nyos, Kam, Cha, and Subum. About 4,000 inhabitants fled the area, and many of these developed respiratory problems, lesions, and paralysis as a result of the gas cloud.

It is a possibility that other volcanic gases were released along with the CO_{2}, as some survivors reported a smell of gunpowder or rotten eggs, which indicates that sulfur dioxide and hydrogen sulfide were present at concentrations above their odour thresholds. However, CO_{2} was the only gas detected in samples of lake water, suggesting that this was the predominant gas released and as such the main cause of the incident.

== Effects on the survior ==
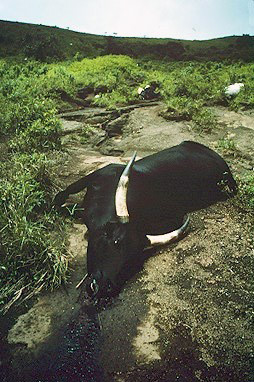
Cattle suffocated by carbon dioxide from Lake Nyos

Reporters in the area described the scene as "looking like the aftermath of a neutron bomb." One survivor, Joseph Nkwain from Subum, described himself when he awoke after the gases had struck:

I could not speak. I became unconscious. I could not open my mouth because then I smelled something terrible [...] I heard my daughter snoring in a terrible way, very abnormal [...] When crossing to my daughter's bed [...] I collapsed and fell. I was there till nine o'clock in the morning [the next day, Friday] [...] until a friend of mine came and knocked at my door [...] I was surprised to see that my trousers were red, had some stains like honey. I saw some [...] starchy mess on my body. My arms had some wounds [...] I didn't really know how I got these wounds [...] I opened the door [...] I wanted to speak, my breath would not come out [...] My daughter was already dead [...] I went into my daughter's bed, thinking that she was still sleeping. I slept till it was 4:30 in the afternoon [...] on Friday [the same day. Then] I managed to go over to my neighbours' houses. They were all dead [...] I decided to leave [...] [because] most of my family was in Wum [...] I got my motorcycle [...] A friend whose father had died left with me [for] Wum [...] As I rode [...] through Nyos I didn't see any sign of any living thing [...] [When I got there] I was unable to walk, even to talk [...] my body was completely weak.

Following the eruption, many survivors were treated at the main hospital in Yaoundé, the country's capital. It was believed that many of the victims had been poisoned by sulphur-based gases. Poisoning by these gases would lead to burning pains in the eyes and nose, coughing and signs of asphyxiation similar to being strangled.

Interviews with survivors and pathologic studies indicated that victims rapidly lost consciousness and that death was caused by CO_{2} asphyxiation. At nonlethal levels, CO_{2} can produce sensory hallucinations, such that many people exposed to CO_{2} report the odor of sulfuric compounds when none are present. Skin lesions found on survivors represent pressure sores, and in a few cases exposure to a heat source, but there is no evidence of chemical burns or of flash burns from exposure to hot gases.

== Mitigation efforts ==
The scale of the disaster led to studies on how a recurrence could be prevented. Several researchers proposed the installation of degassing columns from rafts in the middle of the lake. The principle is to slowly vent the CO_{2} by lifting heavily saturated water from the bottom of the lake through a pipe, initially by using a pump, but only until the release of gas inside the pipe naturally lifts the column of effervescing water, making the process self-sustaining.

Starting from 1995, feasibility studies were successfully conducted, and the first permanent degassing pipe was installed at the lake in 2001. Two additional pipes were installed in 2011. In 2019 it was determined that the degassing had reached an essentially steady state and that a single one of the installed pipes would be able to self-sustain the degassing process into the future, indefinitely maintaining the CO_{2} at a safe level, without any need for external power.

== Similar danger suspected at Lake Kivu ==
Following the Lake Nyos disaster, geoscientists investigated other African lakes to see if a similar phenomenon could happen elsewhere. In 2005, Lake Kivu in the Democratic Republic of the Congo, 2,000 times larger than Lake Nyos, was also found to be supersaturated, and geologists found evidence that outgassing events around the lake happened about every thousand years.

However, a study undertaken in 2018 and released in 2020 found flaws in the 2005 study, including a possible bias in the conversion of concentrations to partial pressures, to an overestimation of concentrations, or to a problem of calibration of sensors at high pressure. The 2020 study found that when these errors were accounted for, the risk of a gas eruption at Lake Kivu did not seem to be increasing over time.

== Popular culture ==
- In The Exodus Decoded (2006), journalist Simcha Jacobovici references the Lake Nyos disaster to explain how the Biblical plagues (such as the Nile River turning into "blood", mass death of livestock, the outbreak of boils and death of the firstborn) occurred due to the Minoan eruption at Santorini circa 1600 BCE. Jacobovici proposed that the Exodus may have coincided with the eruption of Santorini, arguing that seismic activity could have contributed to events described in the biblical narrative, including the plagues and the parting of the Red Sea. Jacobovici also suggested that the biblical Red Sea may have referred to a freshwater lake near modern-day Ismailia. His theories were criticised by archaeologist Manfred Bietak, who argued that the documentary misrepresented his research and stated that there was no archaeological evidence for the existence of the Israelites prior to the Iron Age.

== See also ==
- Sinila volcano gas eruption
- List of natural disasters by death toll
