= Hot Lake =

Hot Lake may refer to:

- Hot Lake (Ontario), a lake in Ontario
- Hot Lake (Humboldt County, Nevada)
- Hot Lake, Oregon, an unincorporated community in Union County, Oregon
- Hot Lake (Washington), a lake in Okanogan County, Washington
- Hot Lake (Wyoming), a lake in Yellowstone National Park in Wyoming
- Hot Lake District, former name for an area of geothermal activity in New Zealand

== See also ==
- Hot spring
