= Keracut Beach =

Beach in Southwest Penang Island, Malaysia

Keracut Beach is a beach in Penang National Park, Southwest Penang Island District, Penang, Malaysia. It is one of the remotest beaches in Penang and is located on the west coast of the cape at the northwest of Penang Island. It shelters a meromictic lake, i.e. one with distinct layers that do not mix.

Green turtles nest there from April to August, and the olive ridley from September to February. In 1995, a turtle hatchery was set up in Pantai Keracut, and is now managed by the State Fisheries Department, Department of Wildlife and National Parks (Perhilitan) and the Forestry Department.

Some rare mammals of the national park have also been spotted at Pantai Keracut.
