= Pavin cheese =

French cheese

Pavin
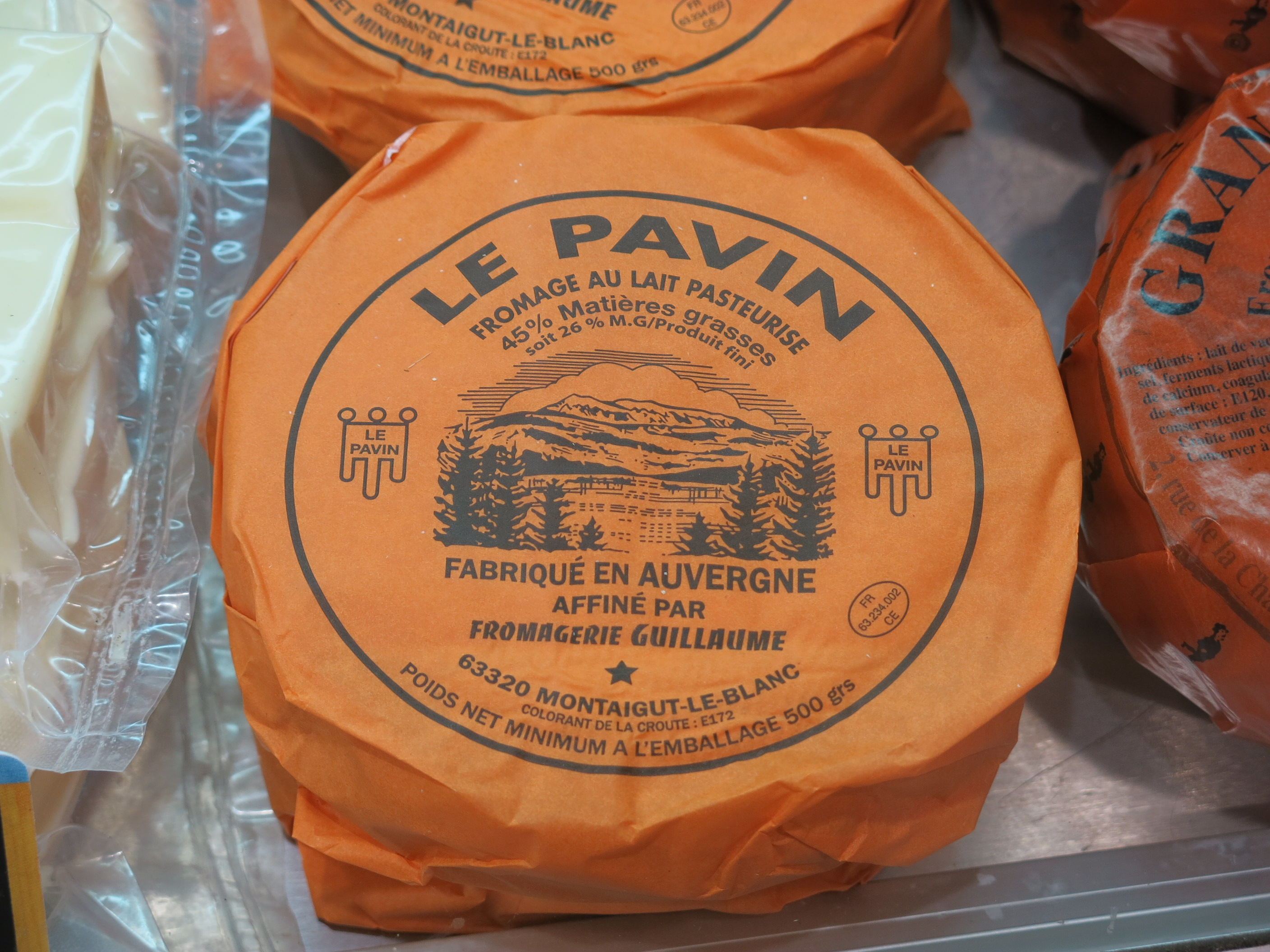
- Country of origin: France
- Region, town: Auvergne
- Source of milk: Cow
- Pasteurised: Yes
- Named after: Lac Pavin

Pavin is a French cheese made in the Auvergne region of central France. The cheese got its name because of a nearby meromictic crater lake called Lac Pavin. It is in the same cheese family as Saint-Nectaire which originates from the same geographic region.
