= Meromictic lake =

Permanently stratified lake with layers of water that do not intermix

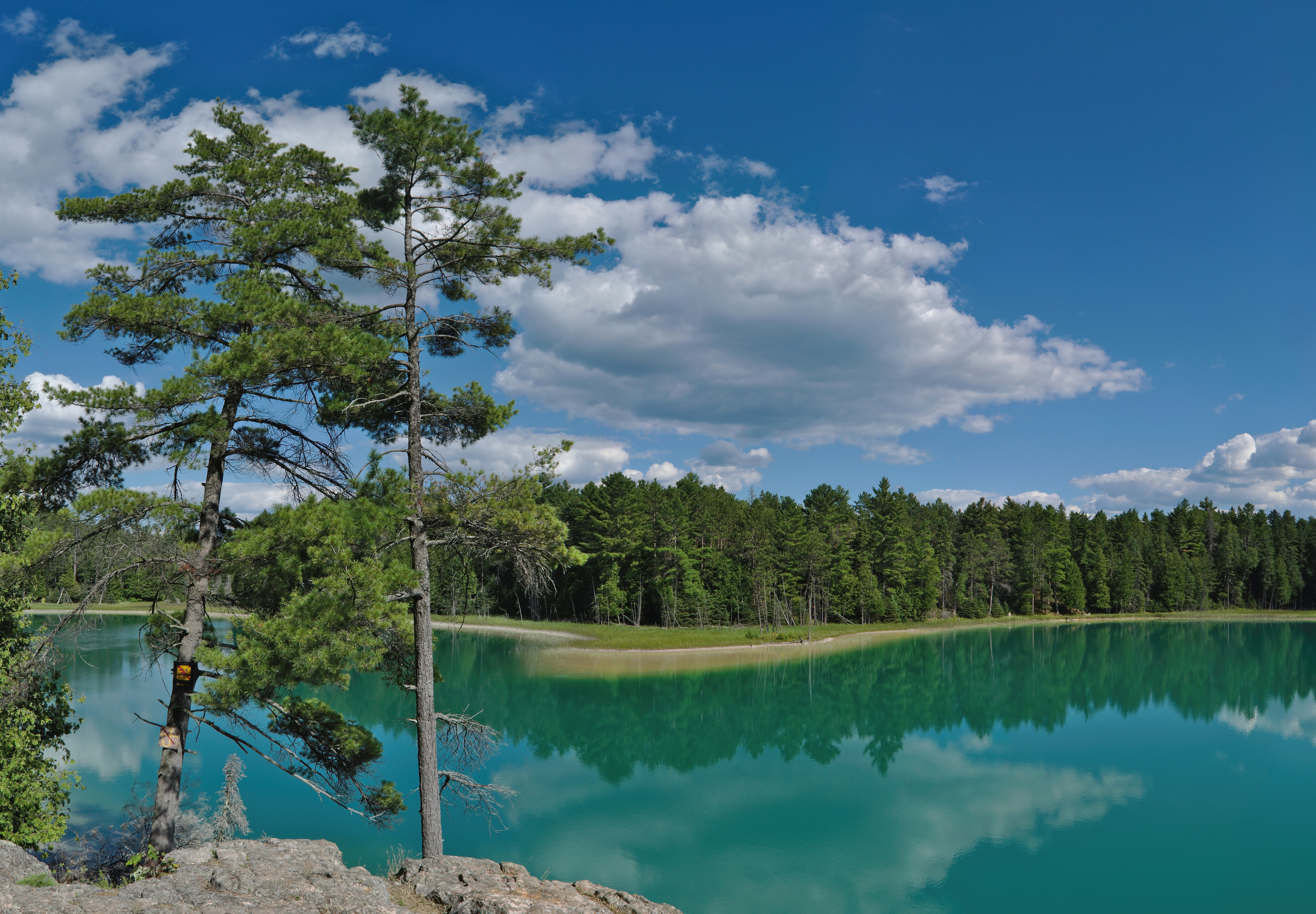
McGinnis Lake is a meromictic lake within the Petroglyphs Provincial Park.

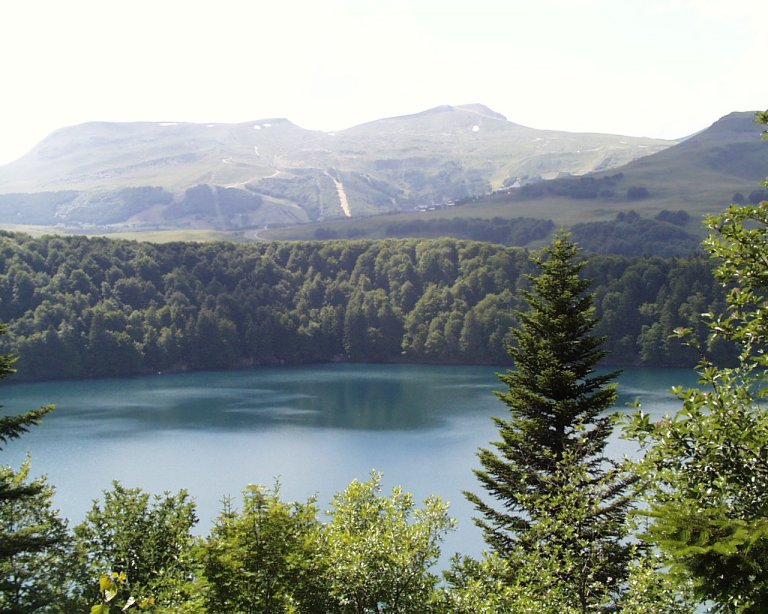
Lac Pavin in France is a meromictic crater lake.

A meromictic lake is a lake which has layers of water that do not intermix. In ordinary, holomictic lakes, there is a physical mixing of surface and deep waters at least once each year.

The term meromictic was coined by the Austrian Ingo Findenegg in 1935, apparently based on the older word holomictic. The concepts and terminology used in describing meromictic lakes were essentially complete following some additions by G. Evelyn Hutchinson in 1937.

== Characteristics ==
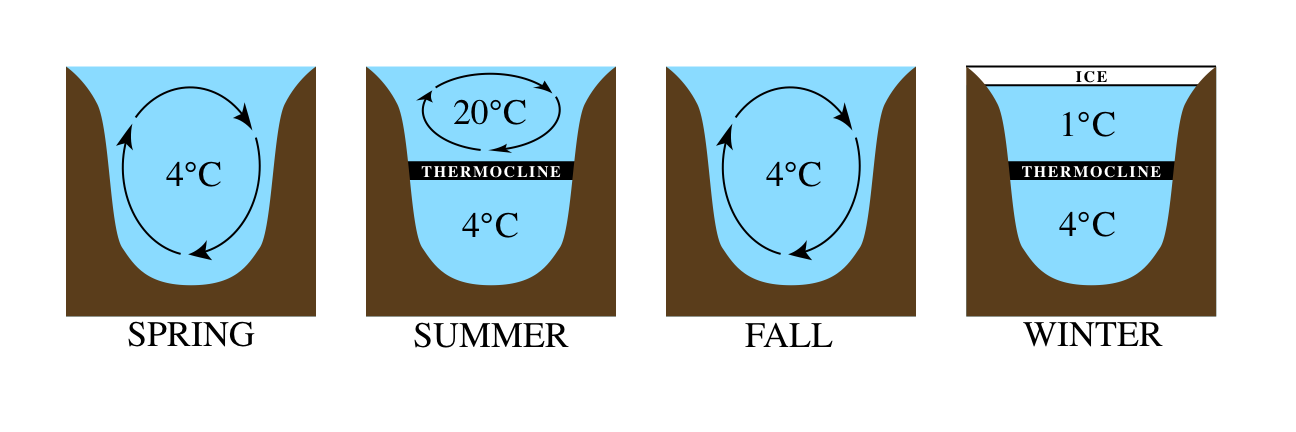
Typical mixing pattern for a dimictic lake. This does not occur in meromictic lakes

Most lakes are holomictic: at least once per year, its surface and deep waters mix, replacing multiple stratified layers with one homogeneous layer spanning the lake. In monomictic lakes, mixing occurs once per year; in dimictic lakes, it occurs twice a year (typically spring and autumn), and in polymictic lakes, mixing occurs several times a year. In meromictic lakes, the layers of water can remain unmixed for years, decades, or centuries.

Meromictic lakes can usually be divided into three sections or layers. The bottom layer is the monimolimnion; the waters in this portion of the lake circulate little, and are generally hypoxic and more saline than the rest of the lake. The top layer is the mixolimnion, and essentially behaves like a holomictic lake. The area in between is the chemocline, or chemolimnion.

The lack of mixing between layers creates radically different environments for life: the stratification, or stable layering, of lake waters means that the bottom layer receives little oxygen from the atmosphere, becoming depleted of oxygen. While the surface layer may have a dissolved oxygen content of 10 mg/L or more in summer, the depths of a meromictic lake can have less than 1 mg/L. Very few organisms can live in such an oxygen-poor environment. One exception is purple sulfur bacteria. These bacteria, commonly found at the top of the monimolimnion in such lakes, use sulfur compounds such as sulfides in photosynthesis. These compounds are produced by decomposition of organic sediments in oxygen-poor environments. The monimolimnion is often rich in phosphorus and nitrogen. These factors combine to create an ideal environment for bacterial growth. The mixolimnion can have similar qualities. However, the types of bacteria that can grow at the surface are determined by the amount of light received at the surface.

A meromictic lake may form because the lake basin is unusually deep and steep-sided compared to the lake's surface area, or because the lower layer of the lake is highly saline and denser than the upper layers of water. However, human influence can lead to cultural meromixis occurring. The increased use of road salt as a deicing strategy, particularly in northern latitude regions, can disturb the natural mixing cycles in lakes by inhibiting mixing. As salt is flushed into aquatic systems at high concentrations in late winter/early spring, it accumulates in the deepest layer of lakes, leading to incomplete mixing.

Stratification in meromictic lakes can be either endogenic or ectogenic. Endogenic means the patterns seen in the lake are caused by internal events, such as organic matter accumulating in the sediments and decaying, whereas ectogenic means the patterns seen are caused by external causes, like an intrusion of saltwater settling in the hypolimnion, preventing it from mixing.

The layers of sediment at the bottom of a meromictic lake remain relatively undisturbed because there is little physical mixing and few living organisms to agitate them. There is also little chemical decomposition. For this reason, cores of the sediment at the bottom of meromictic lakes are important in tracing past changes in climate at the lake, by examining trapped pollen grains and deposited sediment types [see Proxy (climate)].

When the layers do mix for whatever reason, the consequences can be devastating for organisms that normally live in the mixolimnion. This layer is usually much smaller in volume than the monimolimnion. When the layers mix, the oxygen concentration at the surface will decrease dramatically. This can result in the death of many organisms, such as fish, that require oxygen.

Occasionally, carbon dioxide, methane, or other dissolved gases can build up relatively undisturbed in the lower layers of a meromictic lake. When the stratification is disturbed, as could happen from an earthquake, a limnic eruption may result. In 1986, a notable event of this type took place at Lake Nyos in Cameroon, causing nearly 1,800 deaths. In the following decades after this disaster, active research and management has been done to mitigate gas buildup in the future through the Nyos Organ Pipes Program (NOPP). The NOPP program placed large organ pipes reaching into the area of gas buildup that allow for gas release to the atmosphere, effectively degassing the monimolimnion. Since 2019, Lake Nyos has successfully been degassed to a nonhazardous concentration of dissolved gas. Paralleling Lake Nyos, Lake Kivu is another lake that poses a potentially fatal threat to the community. Some management strategies have suggested taking a different approach, moving gases from the monimolimnion to the mixolimnion, rather than degassing to the atmosphere through organ pipes.

While it is mainly lakes that are meromictic, the world's largest meromictic basin is the Black Sea. The deep waters below 50 m (160 ft) do not mix with the upper layers that receive oxygen from the atmosphere. As a result, over 90% of the deeper Black Sea volume is anoxic water. The Caspian Sea is anoxic below 100 m (330 ft). The Baltic Sea is persistently stratified, with dense, highly saline water comprising the bottom layer, and large areas of hypoxic sediments (see Baltic Sea hypoxia).

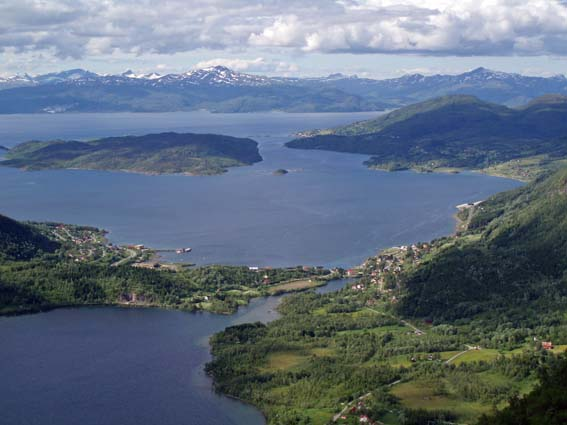
Strandvatnet in Nordland down to the left; only a small isthmus separates the lake from Ofotfjord.

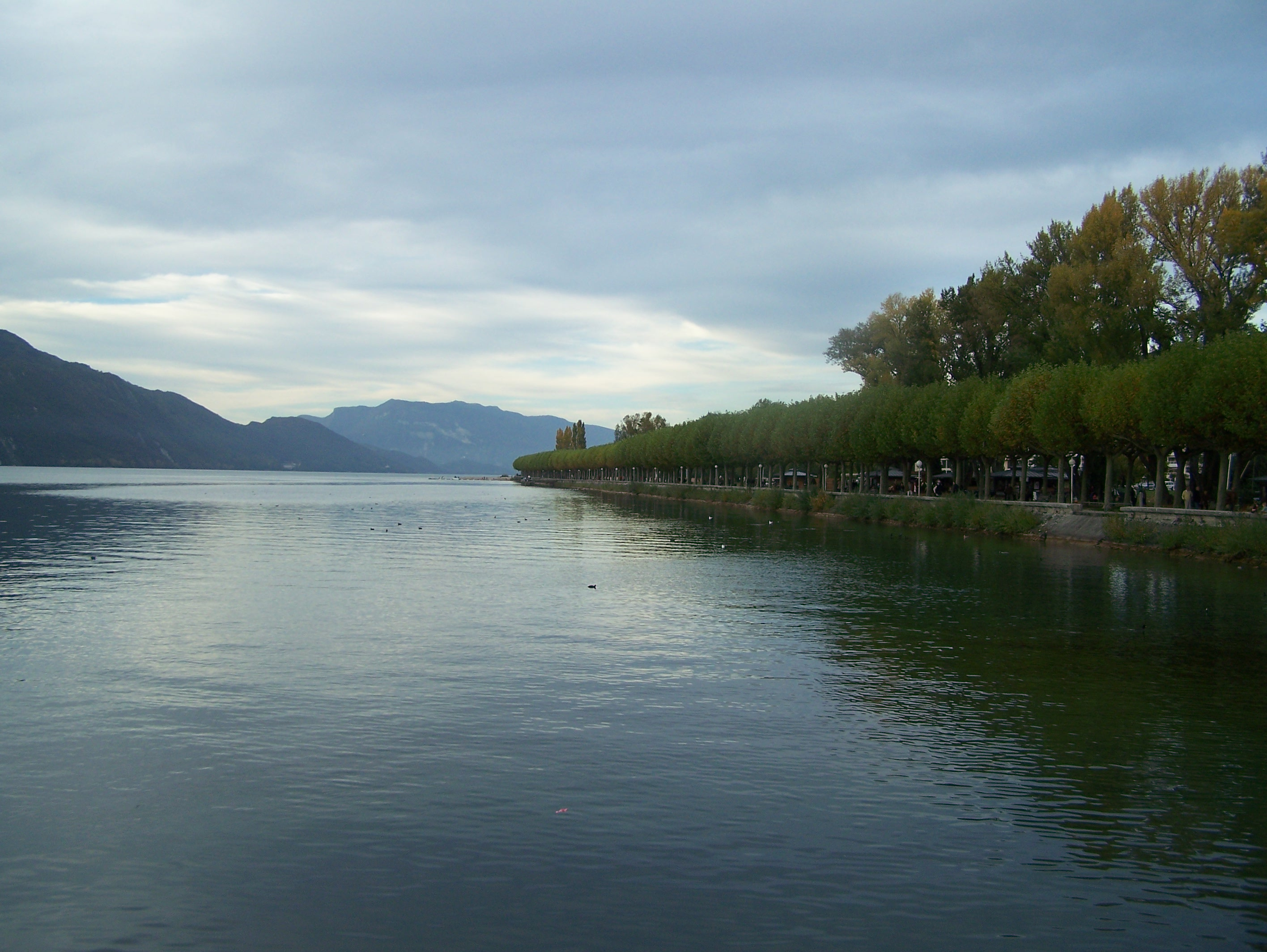
Lac du Bourget is the largest and deepest lake in France

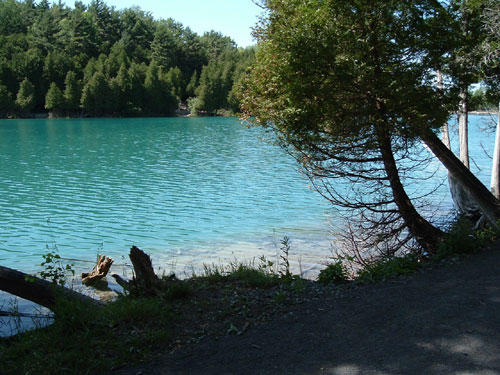
Green Lake is a meromictic lake near Syracuse, New York.

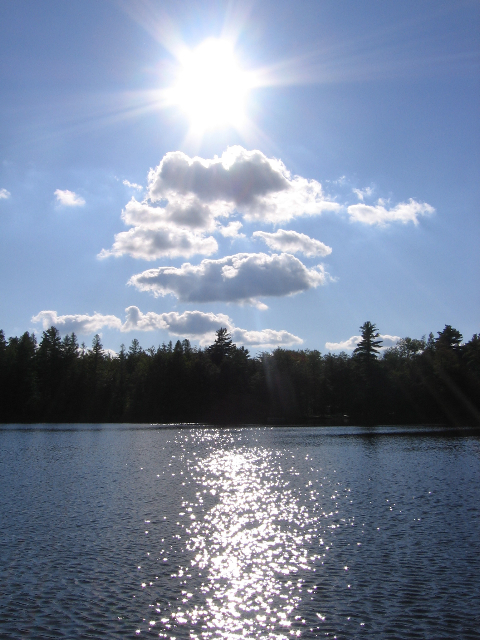
Sunfish Lake is a meromictic lake near Waterloo, Ontario.

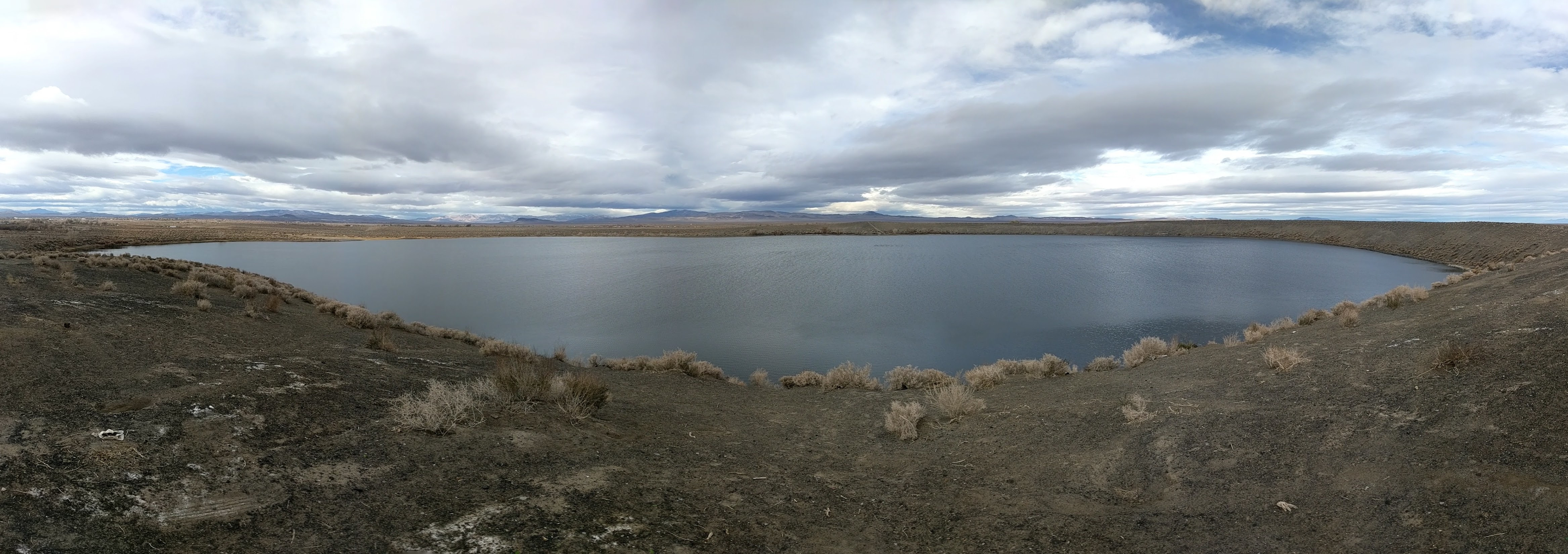
Big Soda Lake is a meromictic lake in a volcanic crater near Fallon, Nevada

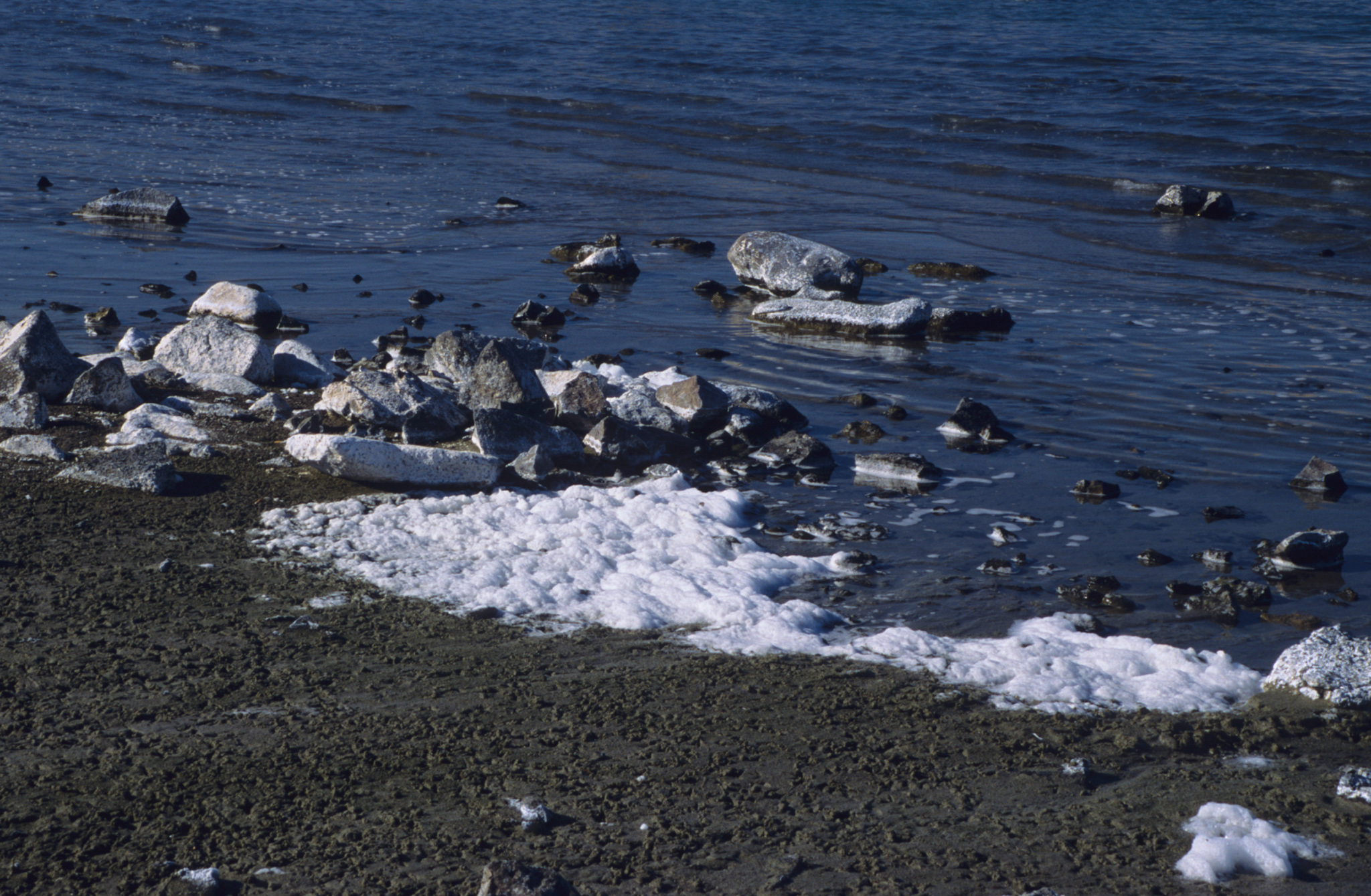
Soapy foam on the shore of Soap Lake in Washington

== List of meromictic lakes ==
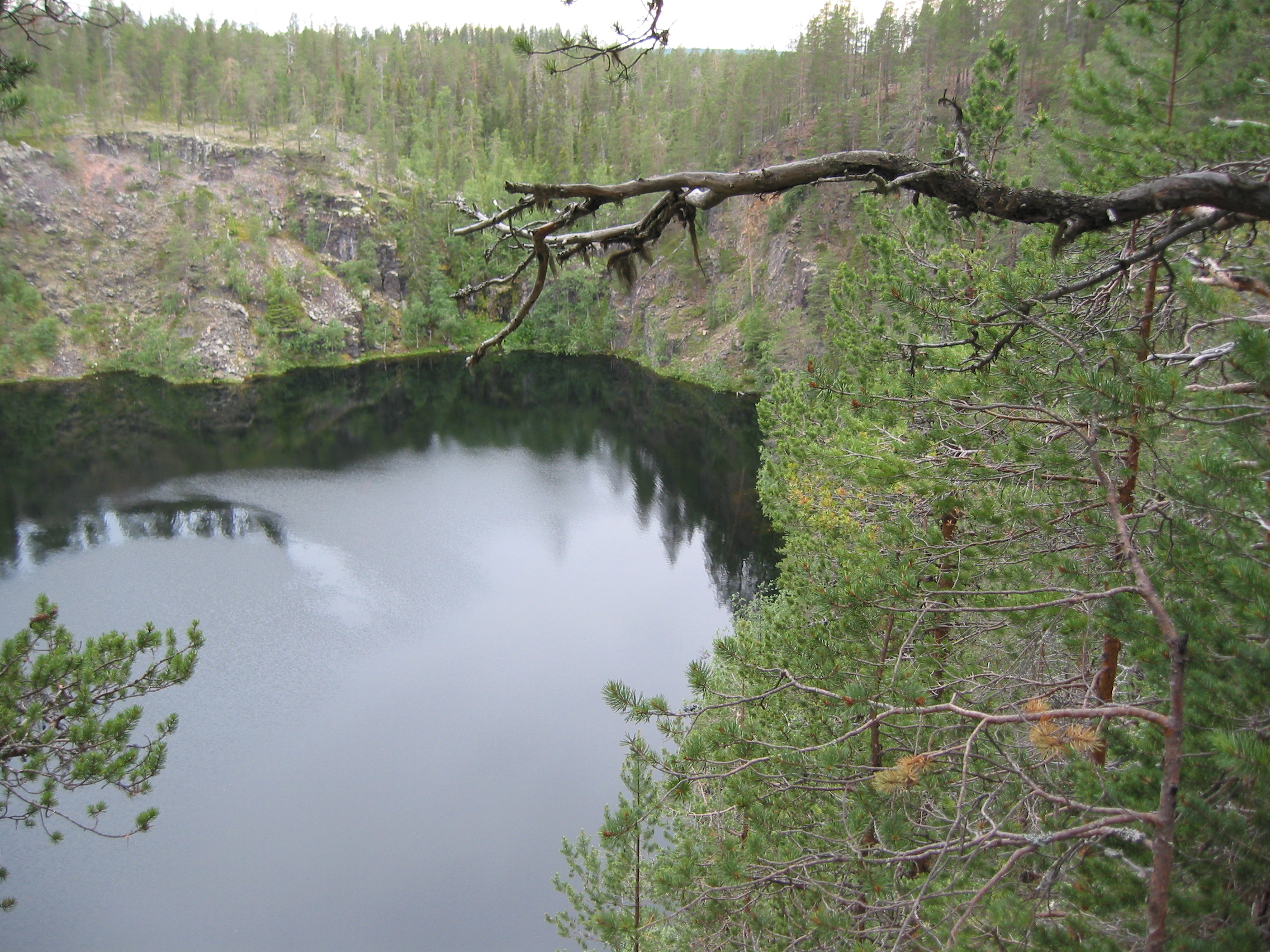
Lake Pakasaivo, a meromictic lake in Muonio, Finland

There are meromictic lakes on every continent. The distribution appears to be clustered, but this may be due to incomplete investigations. Depending on the exact definition of "meromictic", the ratio between meromictic and holomictic lakes worldwide is around 1:1000.

=== Africa ===
- Lake Nyos and Lake Monoun in Cameroon
- Lake Kivu in Rwanda and the Democratic Republic of the Congo
- Lake Tanganyika in Burundi, the Democratic Republic of the Congo, Tanzania and Zambia
- Lake Malawi, located between Malawi, Mozambique and Tanzania

=== Antarctica ===
- Lake Vanda in Ross Dependency
- 21 lakes, including Organic Lake in Vestfold Hills

=== Asia ===
- Lake Shira in the Republic of Khakassia, Russia
- Keracut Beach Lake, Penang National Park, northwest Penang island, Malaysia
- Jellyfish Lake, on Eil Malk in Palau
- Zigetangcuo Lake, a crenogenic lake in Nagqu, Tibet, China. It is the meromictic lake located at the highest altitude.
- Kaptai Lake, in Rangamati Hill District, at the southeastern part of Bangladesh. It was created by constructing a dam at Kaptai to set up a hydroelectric power plant.
- Lake Matano, Sulawesi island, Indonesia
- Lake Suigetsu, Fukui Prefecture, Japan

=== Australia ===
- Lake Fidler, in the Tasmanian Wilderness World Heritage Area

=== Europe ===
- Kärntner Seen (Alpine lakes in the Austrian province of Carinthia; studied by Ingo Findenegg in the 1930s).
- Alatsee near Füssen and Neuschwanstein Castle, Bavaria, Germany
- Lake Vähä-Pitkusta in Finland
- Lake Pakasaivo in Finland
- Lough Furnace in Ireland
- Salvatnet, Kilevann, Tronstadvatn, Birkelandsvatn, Rørholtfjorden, Botnvatn, Rørhopvatn and Strandvatn lakes in Norway
- Czarne Lake in Drawa National Park, Poland
- Lake Mogilnoye in Murmansk Oblast of Russia
- Lake Cadagno, crenogenic, in Switzerland, and the location of the Alpine Biology Center
- Lac Pavin and Lac du Bourget in France
- The Black Sea – while not a lake – is also considered to be meromictic.
- Lake El Tobar in Cuenca, Spain
- Lake La Cruz in Cuenca, Spain

=== North America ===
- Canada
  - Lake McKay in Ottawa, Ontario
  - Lakes A and C1 on Ellesmere Island, Nunavut
  - Blackcat Lake near Dorset, Ontario, in Frost Centre
  - Crawford Lake near Milton, Ontario
  - Picard Lake near Lakehurst, Ontario
  - Mahoney Lake in the Okanagan Valley, British Columbia
  - McGinnis Lake in Petroglyphs Provincial Park, Ontario
  - Pink Lake in Gatineau Park, Quebec
  - Powell Lake in the town of Powell River, British Columbia
  - Sakinaw Lake in British Columbia
  - Sunfish Lake near Waterloo, Ontario
  - Little Round Lake (Ontario) in Central Frontenac, Ontario
  - Teapot Lake, Heart Lake Conservation Area, Brampton, Ontario. See also Heart Lake (Ontario)
- Central America
  - Lake Atitlán, endorheic lake in the department of Sololá, Guatemala
- United States
  - Ballston Lake, north northwest of Albany, New York
  - Big Soda Lake, Nevada
  - Brownie Lake in Minneapolis, Minnesota
  - Canyon Lake near Big Bay, Michigan
  - Chapel Lake, in Pictured Rocks National Lakeshore, near Munising, Michigan
  - Great Salt Lake near Salt Lake City, Utah
  - Green Lake and Round Lake in Green Lakes State Park near Syracuse, New York
  - Hot Lake in Okanogan County, Washington
  - Knaack Lake, Wisconsin
  - Lake Mary, in the northwest corner of Vilas County, Wisconsin
  - Lower Mystic Lake in Arlington and Medford, Massachusetts
  - Redoubt Lake near Sitka, Alaska; one of North America's largest meromictic lakes
  - Soap Lake in Washington

== See also ==
- Limnological tower
