= Pakasaivo =

Lake in Muonio, Finland

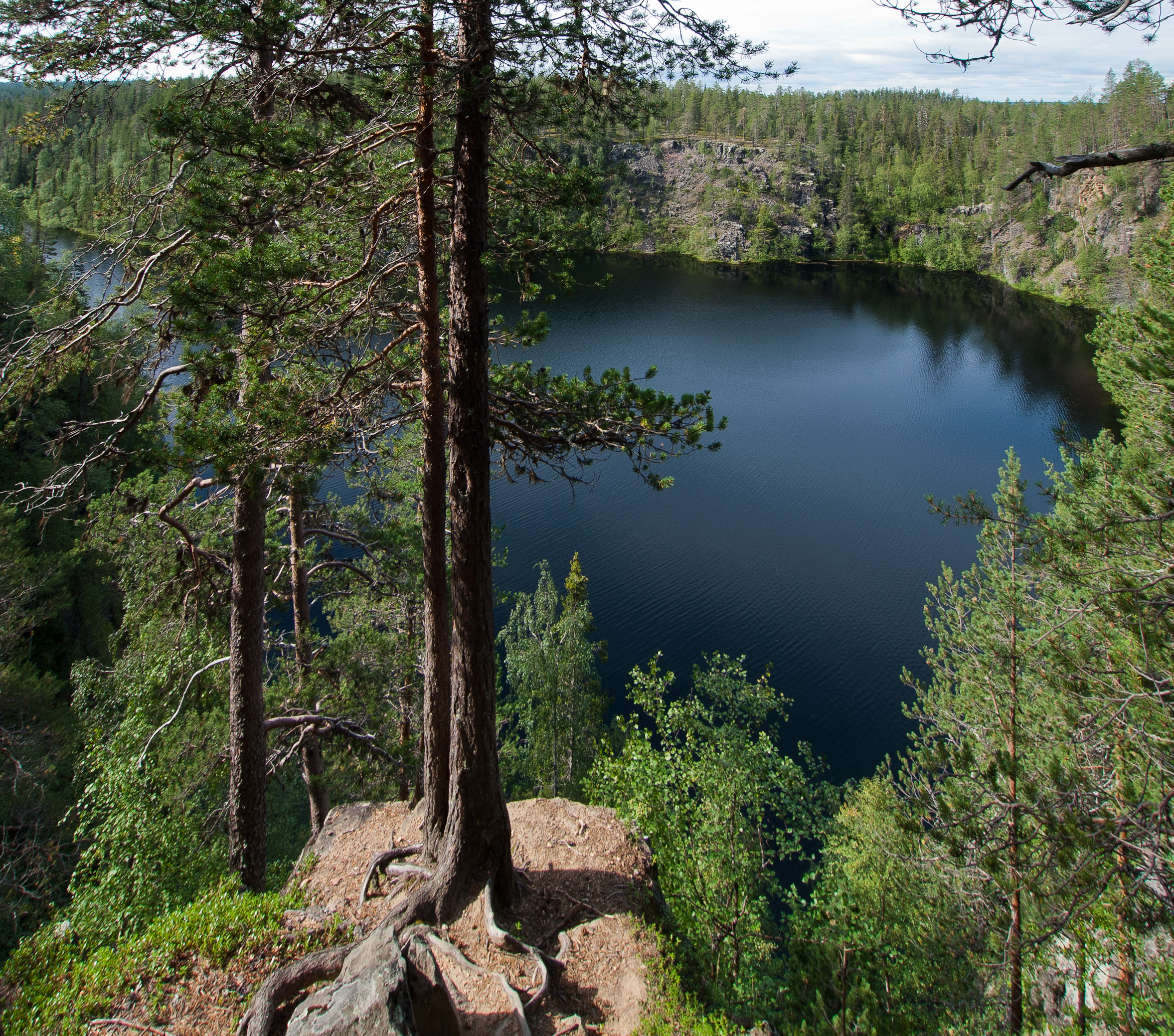
- Interactive map of Pakasaivo
- Coordinates: 67°36′42″N 23°47′25″E
- Type: Meromictic
- Max. depth: 60 metres (200 ft)
- Surface elevation: 215 metres (705 ft)

Pakasaivo is a small and unusually deep meromictic lake in Muonio, Finland. Historically, the lake was also an important site in Sámi shamanism and folklore.

== Geography ==
The lake lies in a steep gorge 15 kilometres west of the village of Äkäslompolo. At its northern end is a roughly bowl-shaped section that is about 120 metres across and has a water depth of 60 metres and has been likened to an enormous giant's kettle. The granite walls around the lake rise steeply 30-40 metres above the surface level, giving the landform a total depth of some 100 metres from the bottom of the lake to the top of the cliffs.

A narrow strait between the rock walls leads to the lake's much shallower southern basin that only has a maximum depth of 8 metres. The lake is slightly over 1 kilometre long and approximately 150 metres at its widest point in the north basin and some 15-20 metres at its narrowest in the strait.

== Geological origins ==
The north–south bedrock fracture that initially formed the gorge has existed for millions of years, and was further deepened and shaped by erosion during the Last Glacial Period.

When the ice sheets melted around 10,500 years ago, a high-pressure subglacial stream ran through Pakasaivo, forming a long-lasting whirlpool and contributing to the formation of the gorge. At the end of the deglaciation about 10,000 years ago the meltwater from a large glacial lake northwest of Pakasaivo rushed through the gorge, scouring the bottom clean of loose rocks.

After the ice age, the granite walls have weathered over the millennia, forming scree slopes along the shores.

== Limnology ==
Pakasaivo is meromictic, meaning that unlike most lakes, the layers of water are permanently stratified and do not intermix throughout the seasons or over the years. The surface water is regular lakewater to a depth of 12.5 metres while below this level the water becomes anoxic and has high levels of hydrogen sulfide.

Three small unnamed streams flow into the lake, while the sole outflow is a small river named Valkeajoki that flows into the Äkäsjoki river, making the lake part of the Tornio river basin.

== Mythology and history ==
In Sámi shamanism, Pakasaivo was believed to be one of the saivo lakes connecting the world of the living with the spirit world or afterlife. According to folklore, these lakes had two-layered bottoms, under which past people and supernatural creatures and spirits lived. There was a sieidi sacred site on the eastern shore where sacrifices of fish and reindeer were made to the spirit of the lake. The ethnographer Samuli Paulaharju wrote about these beliefs in his books Lapin muisteluksia (1922) and Seitoja ja seidan palvontaa (1932).

== Access ==
The lake is a protected site under the Finnish Antiquities Act (295/1963) and can be reached by the Pakasaivontie forest road off either national road 14 from the north or regional road 940 from the south. There is a small wilderness rest stop where the road passes near the lake, and a footpath leads to a platform overlooking the lake.

Another sieidi location, the Kirkkopahta stone is along the same forest road about 3 kilometres southeast of Pakasaivo.
