= Heart Lake (Ontario) =

Lake in Brampton, Ontario, Canada

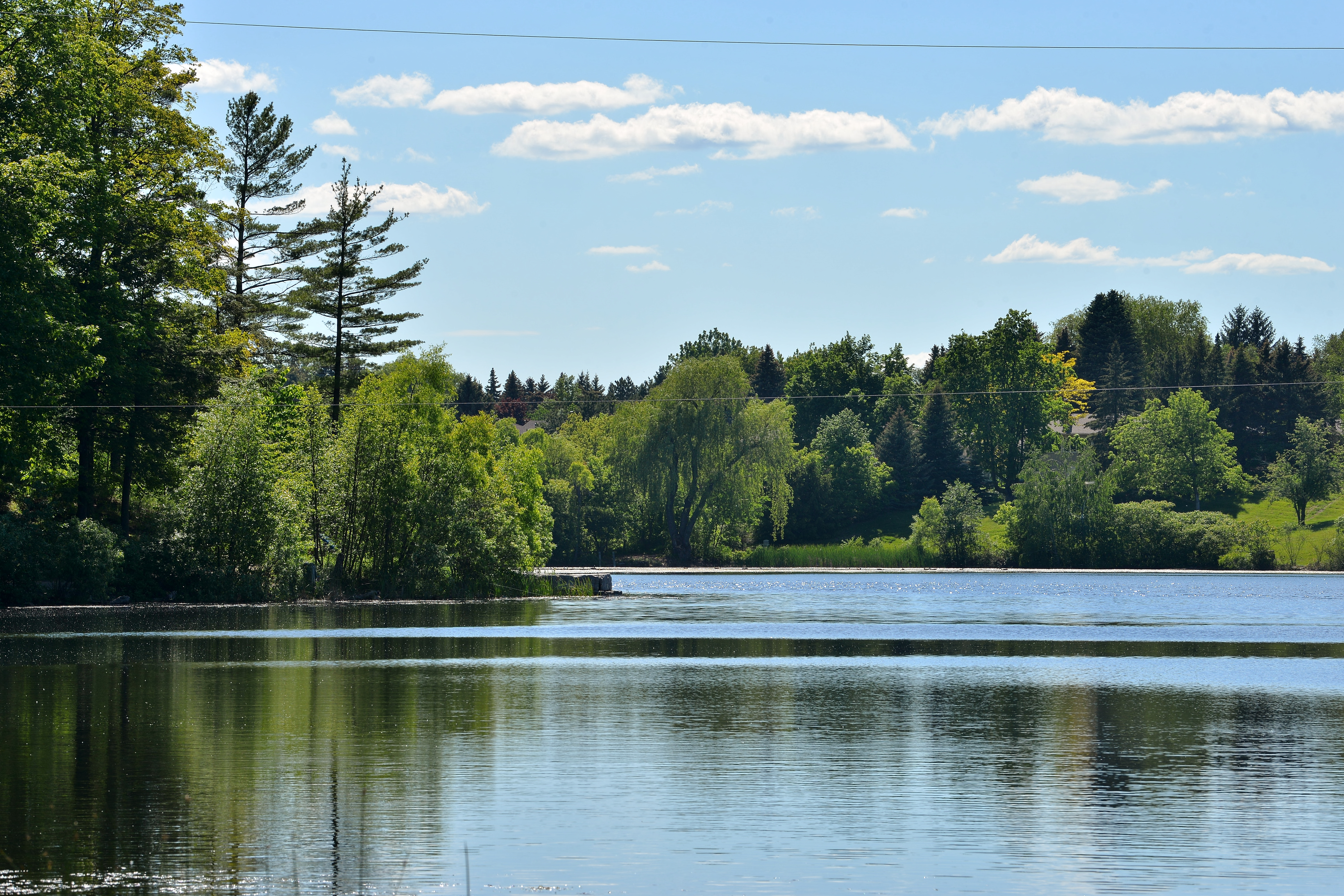

- Location within Ontario
- Location: Ontario
- Coordinates: 43.74052°N 79.79595°W
- Basin countries: Canada
- Surface area: 17.5 ha (43 acres)
- Average depth: 5–6 metres (16–20 ft) average
- Max. depth: ~10 metres (33 ft)

Heart Lake is a lake located in the northern part of Brampton, Ontario, Canada.

Heart Lake along with Teapot Lake (0.7 hectares / 1.26 metres (4.1 ft) depth) are kettle lakes with the latter being a unique meromictic lake. The area was opened for public use in the 1950s.

== Conservation Area ==
The lake itself is found in the 418 acre-Heart Lake Conservation Area in which trees are planted every year by students from the local elementary schools. There are numerous biking and running trails, as well as boat rentals. The community immediately surrounding around the lake takes its name from it, as do several institutions, including Heart Lake Secondary School.
