= Alatsee =

Mountain lake in the Allgäu Alps in Bavaria, Germany

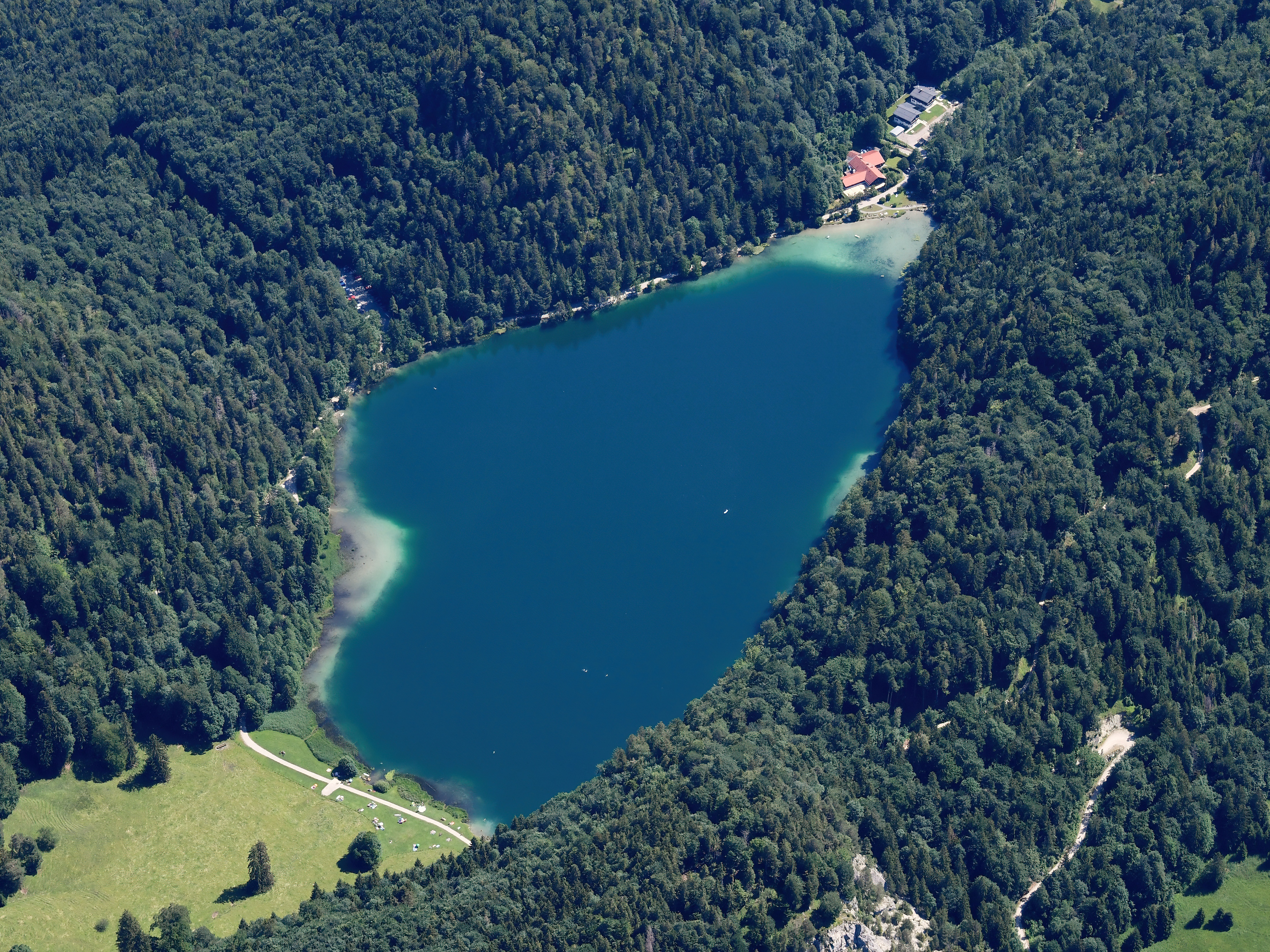

- Location within Bavaria
- Location: Ostallgäu, Bavaria
- Coordinates: 47°33′39″N 10°38′22″E
- Type: meromictic
- Primary inflows: groundwater
- Primary outflows: Faulenbach
- Basin countries: Germany
- Max. length: 490 m (1,610 ft)
- Max. width: 290 m (950 ft)
- Surface area: 12.00 ha (29.7 acres)
- Average depth: 15.3 m (50 ft)
- Max. depth: 32.1 m (105 ft)
- Water volume: 1,840,000 m^{3} (65,000,000 cu ft)
- Shore length^{1}: 1.3 km (0.81 mi)
- Surface elevation: 868.0 m (2,847.8 ft)
- ^{1} Shore length is not a well-defined measure.

Alatsee is a meromictic lake in Ostallgäu, Bavaria, Germany.

At an elevation of 868 metres (2,848 ft), its surface area is 12 hectares (30 acres).

Many divers have died or disappeared mysteriously in the lake due to the toxicity of the organisms living in the lake. These organisms create the "blood cloud " that occurs quite abundantly throughout the year.
