= Blackcat Lake =

Blackcat Lake Ontario

Blackcat Lake is a small meromictic lake in Haliburton, Ontario. The lake has a mean depth of 16.9 metres (55 ft), and its watershed covers 44 hectares (110 acres). The lake is regularly stocked with trout.

In 2004 a proposal to make the Clear Lake Conservation Reserve a World Heritage Site included Blackcat Lake's meromictic status.
