= Lac Pavin =

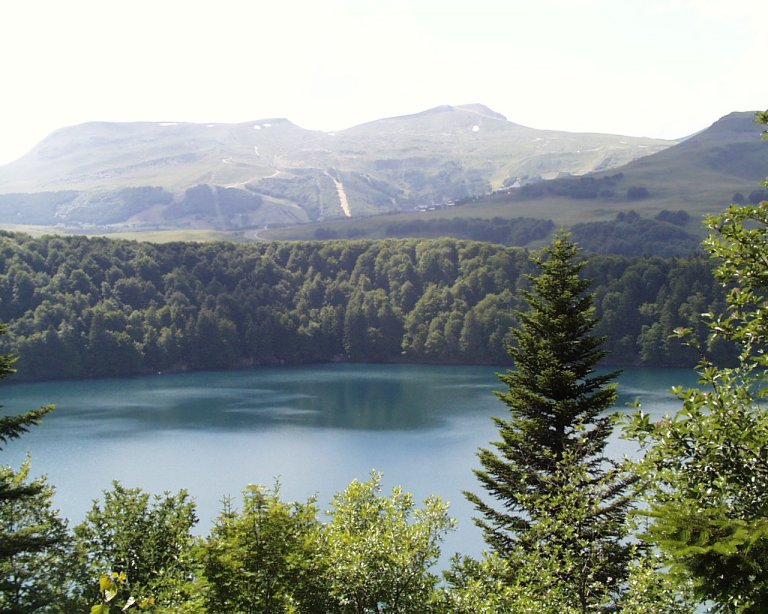

- Location within Auvergne-Rhône-Alpes Location within France
- Location: Besse-et-Saint-Anastaise, Puy-de-Dôme, France
- Coordinates: 45°29′45.05″N 2°53′16.52″E
- Type: meromictic, volcanic crater lake
- Basin countries: France
- Surface area: 44 ha (110 acres)
- Max. depth: 92 m (302 ft)
- Surface elevation: 1,197 m (3,927 ft)

Lac Pavin or Lake Pavin (Auvergnat: Lac Pavent) is a meromictic crater lake, located in the Dore mountains, in Auvergne (Massif central), in the territory of the commune of Besse-et-Saint-Anastaise, Puy-de-Dôme department of France, between Besse-en-Chandesse and Super-Besse. Formed by phreatomagmatism 6,900 years ago, this crater lake is the youngest volcano in mainland France

It gives its name to a cheese: Pavin cheese.

== Description ==
Located at an altitude of 1,197 m [ a ], the lake was formed by phreatomagmatism, in other words it is a maar. Generally circular in shape with a diameter of 700 to 800 m and an area of 44 ha, it has an average depth of 29.5m and a maximum depth of 92m, making it the deepest in Auvergne ( i.e. a volume of approximately 13 million m 3 of water).

It is visited by approximately 200,000 people per year. The Couze Pavin river which passes 300m from the lake is only partially fed by the latter.

It is of very recent origin unlike the Dore Mountains massif. It was formed after the period of volcanic activity which created the Puys chain, around 6,900 years ago, making it one of the youngest volcanic structures in mainland France. It is not linked to the Puys chain. The explosion which formed it was very violent: traces of this event were found as far away as the sediments of Lake Geneva and other Swiss lakes. The volume of the eruption is estimated at 75 million m^{3}.

On a clear day, with the blue sky reflecting in the water, it appears very colourful, almost midnight blue. On the other hand, in stormy weather, its deep waters appear very dark, which undoubtedly earned it its name Pavin (from the Latin pavens, terrible).

The oxygenated waters of Lake Pavin are home to zooplankton and fish, notably Arctic char, which live in deep water (30 to 70m). Deep waters have a density of more than 10 million bacteria per millilitre of water (density ten times that of standard lakes), including methanogenic (i.e. methane -producing ), archaea, as well as other methane consuming species. Certain archaea oxidize some of the methane they produce in order to consume it.

== Toponymy ==
"Pavin" is a Francization of its local Occitan name: Lac Pavent which means "terrible lake".

This same word comes from the Latin pavens (adjective participle of pavere which means "to be struck with terror"). The name of "Lake Pavin" would therefore mean, word for word both in Occitan and in its ancestor Latin, "terrible lake".

== Meromictic lake ==
Lake Pavin is unique in France: (Note: The only other was Lac de la Girotte, a natural lake (dissolution in gypsum) 99 meters deep over 57 hectares in Haute-Savoie. Having been converted to a reservoir, it has lost this characteristic. Lake Bourget and Lake Geneva come close to this category but their monimolimnion is not totally anoxic.) it is a meromictic lake, officially classified as such in 1951. The mixing of water, annual or biennial, only takes place over the first 60 meters: this property is explained by the almost conical shape of the volume of water, its enclosed and protected location from wind and the existence of underground sources, which mineralize deep waters and make them denser.

The anoxic waters of the lake bottom, between 60 and 92 meters, are confined and loaded with gases such as carbon dioxide, nitrogen, methane and hydrogen sulphide, linked to the decomposition of organic matter, which gives them a bad odour. The gas and its composition is monitored because an increase could lead to risks of catastrophic degassing, a phenomenon called "limnic eruption" by some researchers, but according to the work of Haroun Tazieff, a phreato-gaseous eruption could occur. However, ground movements (significant rock falls) or seismic events could disrupt this balance and lead to sudden degassing.

== New hypotheses concerning the activity of Lake Pavin ==
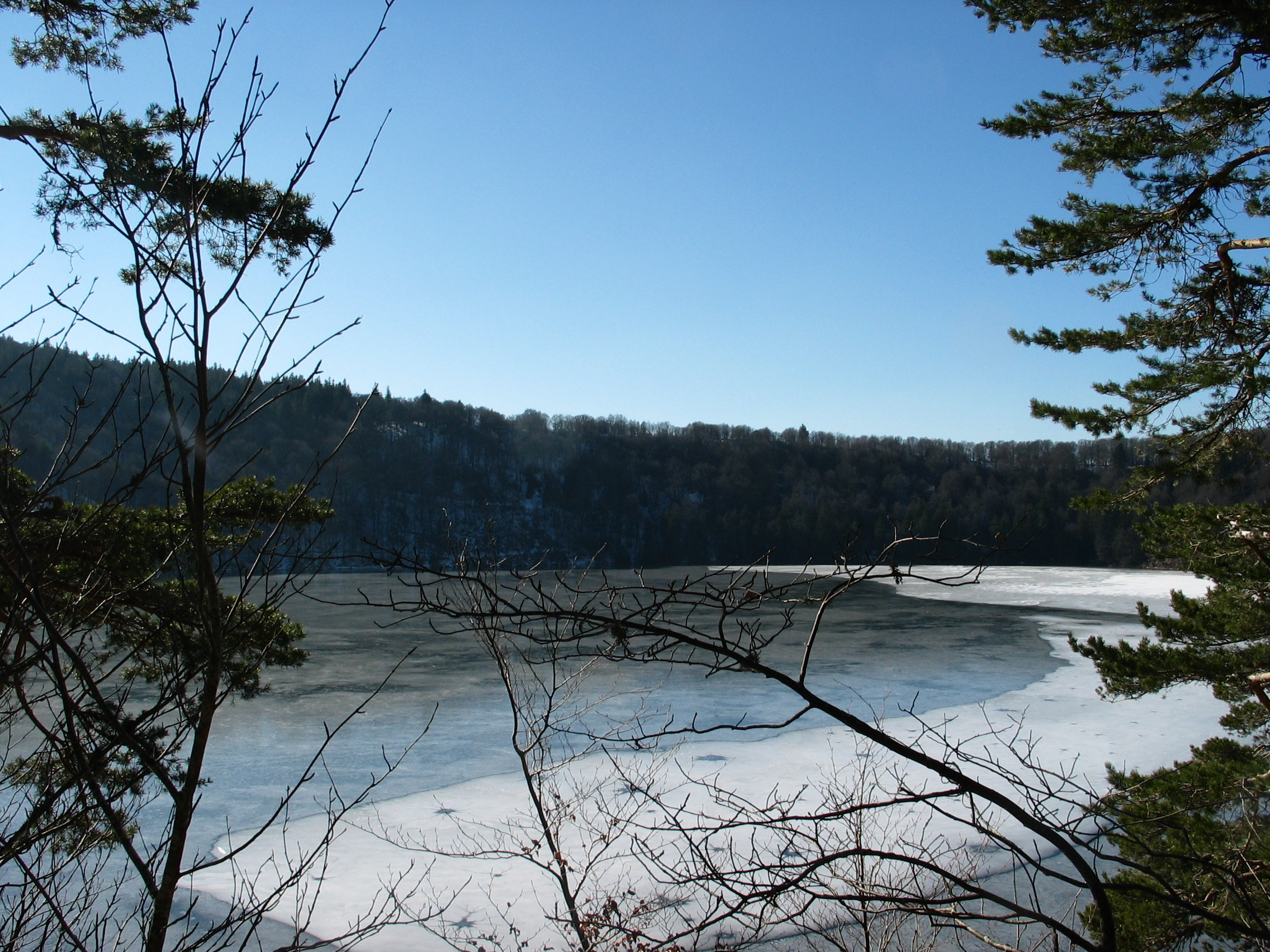
View of the partially frozen lake.

The lake has been studied by scientists since the 18th century: the Count of Montlosier in his Study on the Volcanoes of Auvergne of 1789 proposed that the lake came from a "powdery explosion". Its unaltered characteristics (meromictic lake and pristine (Note: Primitive lake little anthropised.)) has meant that it has been widely studied, particularly with regard to hydrobiology. Scientific teams attached to the CNRS from Lyon, Paris, Clermont-Ferrand and Orléans launched a platform in 2013 allowing samples to be taken in the middle of the lake. This platform is raised in Winter.

The volcanic activity of the Pavin Lake sector is the subject of debate within the scientific community:

- Volcanic activity

While it is commonly accepted that the Montchal-Pavin system (the Puy de Montchal located near the lake at an altitude of 1,400 m having formed a trachy - basalt volcanic cone ) erupted approximately 6,900 years ago for Lake Pavin and 7,000 years for the Puy de Montchal, a second peri-volcanic phase would have occurred only 3,500 to 2,000 years ago, then 750 years ago and gaseous emanations still persist today.

- Rising waters and overflows

The lake would have overflowed several times during its history, the most recent event would have deposited mudslides in the Couze valley around 750 years ago; these mudflows were mapped, dated and analyzed by the two previous researchers.

- Seismic activities

Land movements (landslides or earthquakes) would have taken place within the lake or nearby, which caused the appearance of turbidity within the lake and which could release toxic gases, like the Lake Nyos. A manuscript from 1650, entitled Le Pavin et le hollow de Soucy, describes a lake with swirling waters covered in fog, the possible origin of the legends surrounding this lake.

It is possible that the legends concerning Pavin are partially, or even completely, linked to these natural hazards.

This work was presented by the two researchers during an international scientific conference organized in Besse in 2009, during which two facts were highlighted.

The discovery of these mudslides was noted by the entire scientific community, and gave rise to new research that is still ongoing. The teams from the Magmas and Volcanoes laboratory reject the hypothesis of a volcanic episode of the Pavin crater after 6,900 BP (which has never been affirmed by the two authors, who evoke peri-volcanic and not purely volcanic phenomena for the Pavin crater 6,900 years ago).

== Legends ==
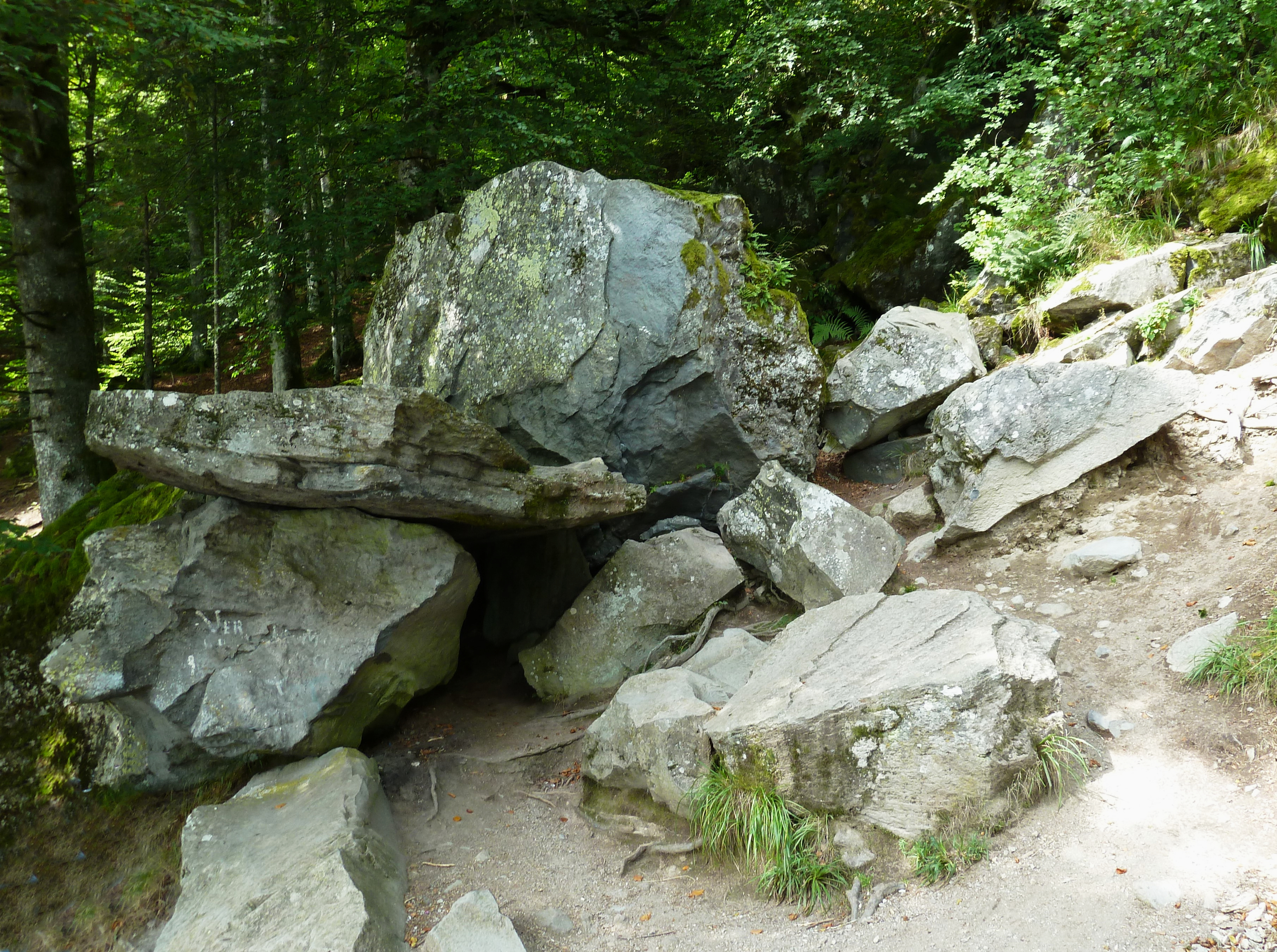
Lake Pavin, the dolmen, wooded path (west bank).

Thanks to the unusual nature of the lake, several historic stories and legends attach to it.

It is said that Lucifer challenged the Creator by kidnaping a young lady. During a fierce fight, the divine spirit forces the evil-one to go back to Hell’s abysses. Sat on the lake’s edge, inconsolable, he cried so many tears that the lake filled up with its tears.

A similar version has it that it was God who drowned the city under torrential waters in order to punish its promiscuous inhabitants. However, the authentic versions of these legends are much more complex, less well-known, and probably closer to a description than to a tale.

Other legends say that if you throw a stone in the middle of the lake, he wakes up and a throw of stones hits him. December 31 at midnight you can hear the bells of the old church of Besse ringing.

== Representation in culture ==
=== Television ===
The site is the main location of the TV film Meurtres en Auvergne (2016) from the collection of Franco-Belgian police TV films called Meurtres à....

== Climbing ==
The climbing site, located on the western edge of Lake Pavin, is a cliff resulting from a basalt flow escaped from the Puy de Montchal, just over 1 km away. Although located at an altitude of 1,200 meters, this cliff faces southwest and climbing can therefore be practiced from April to December. The paths run through basalt organs where dihedrons (with large cracks at the bottom) and rectilinear pillars alternate. Initially equipped by the Super-Besse mountain gendarmerie platoon, the site offers 24 routes20 to 25 m high, rated 4 to 6c, with predominance of levels 6a and 6b.

== Old postcards of the Lake ==
Photos of the lake in 1929

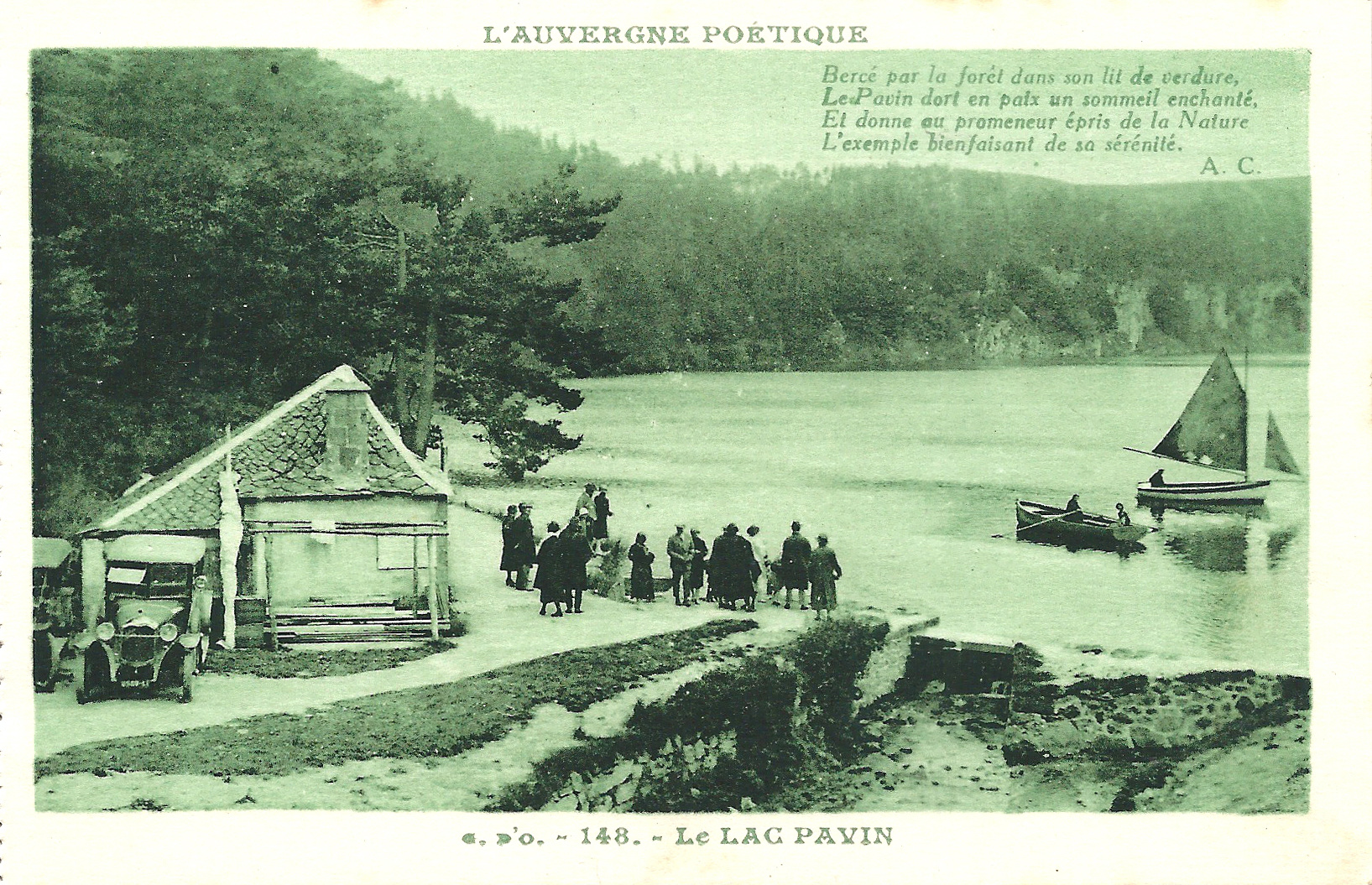

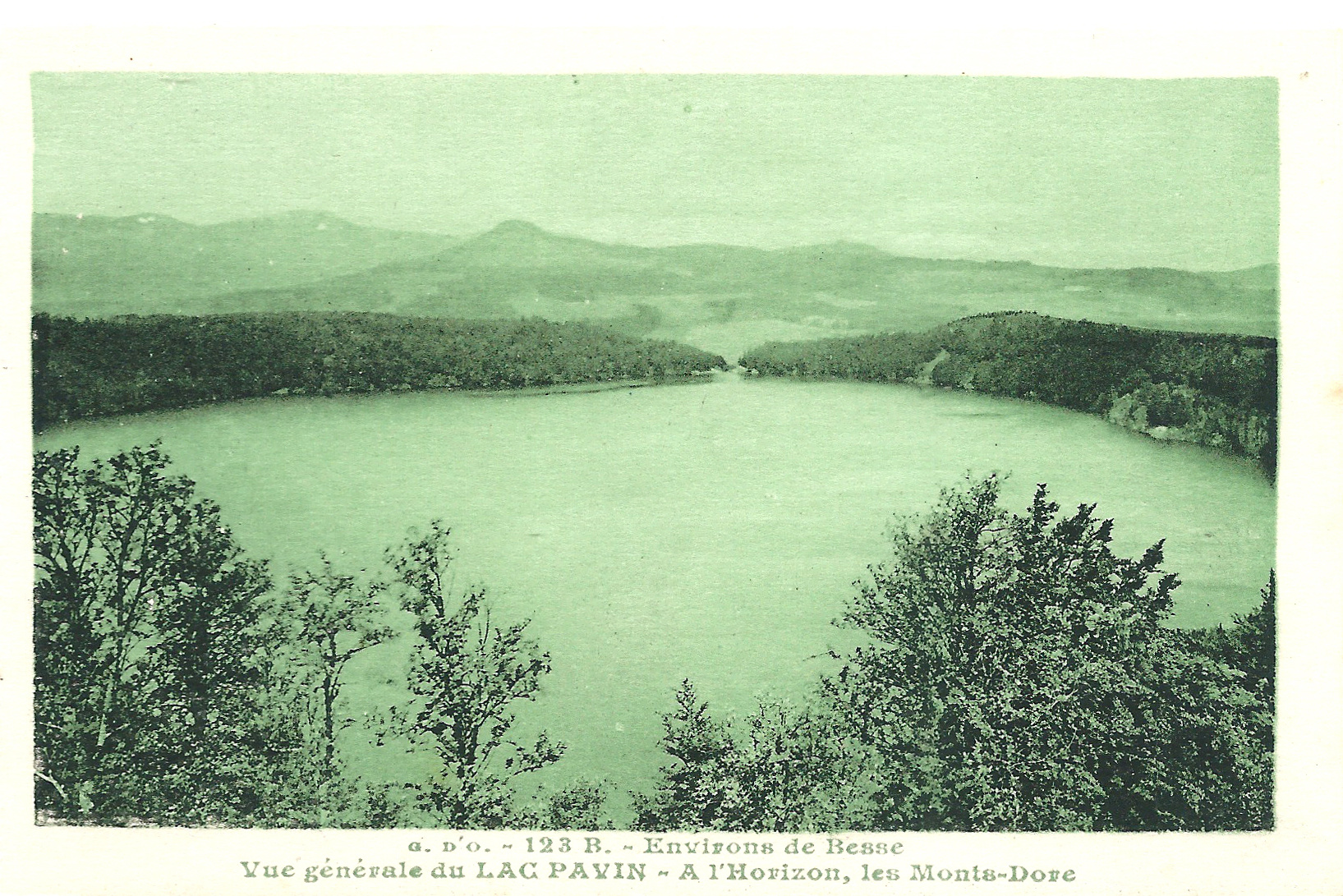

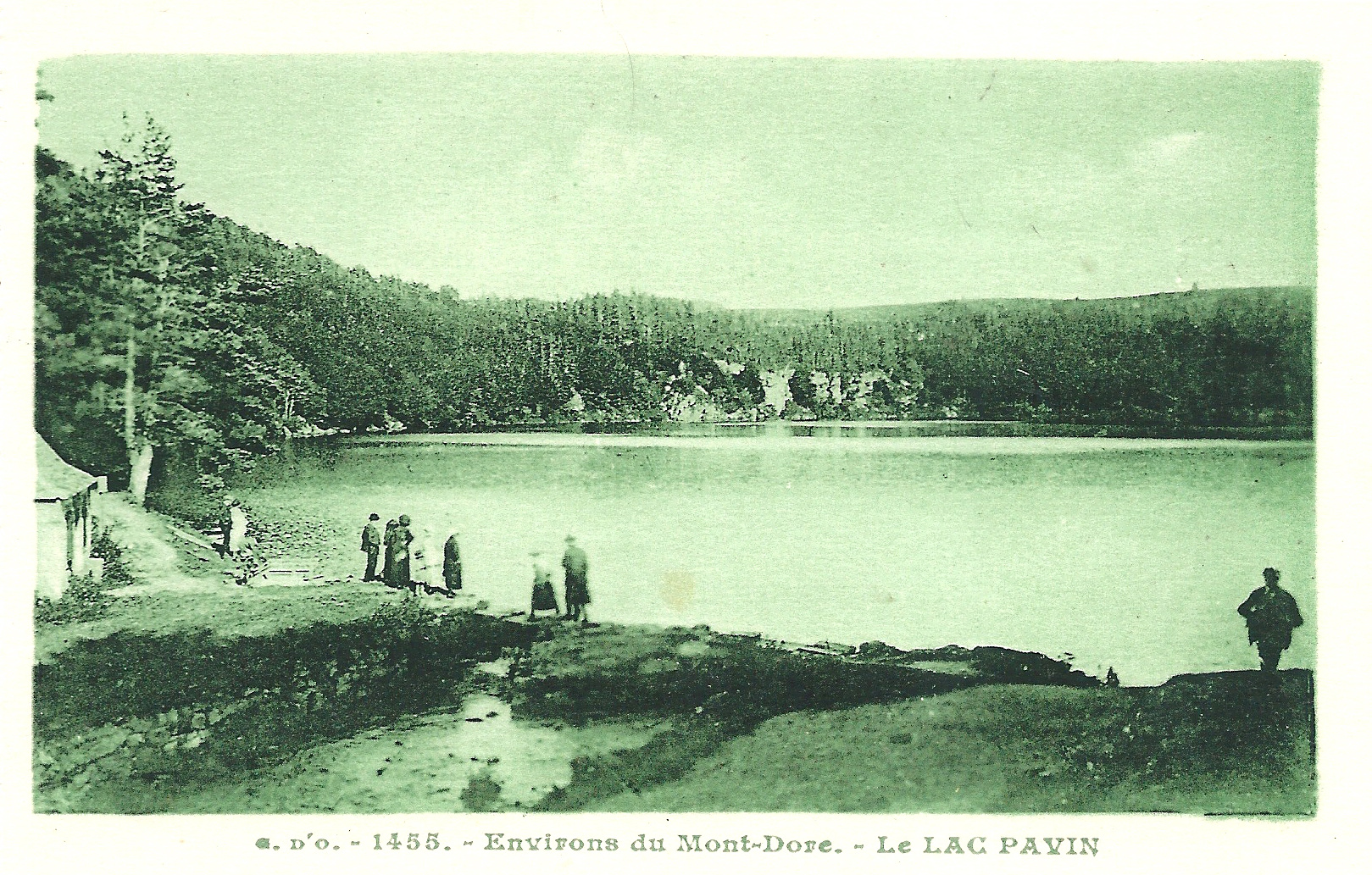

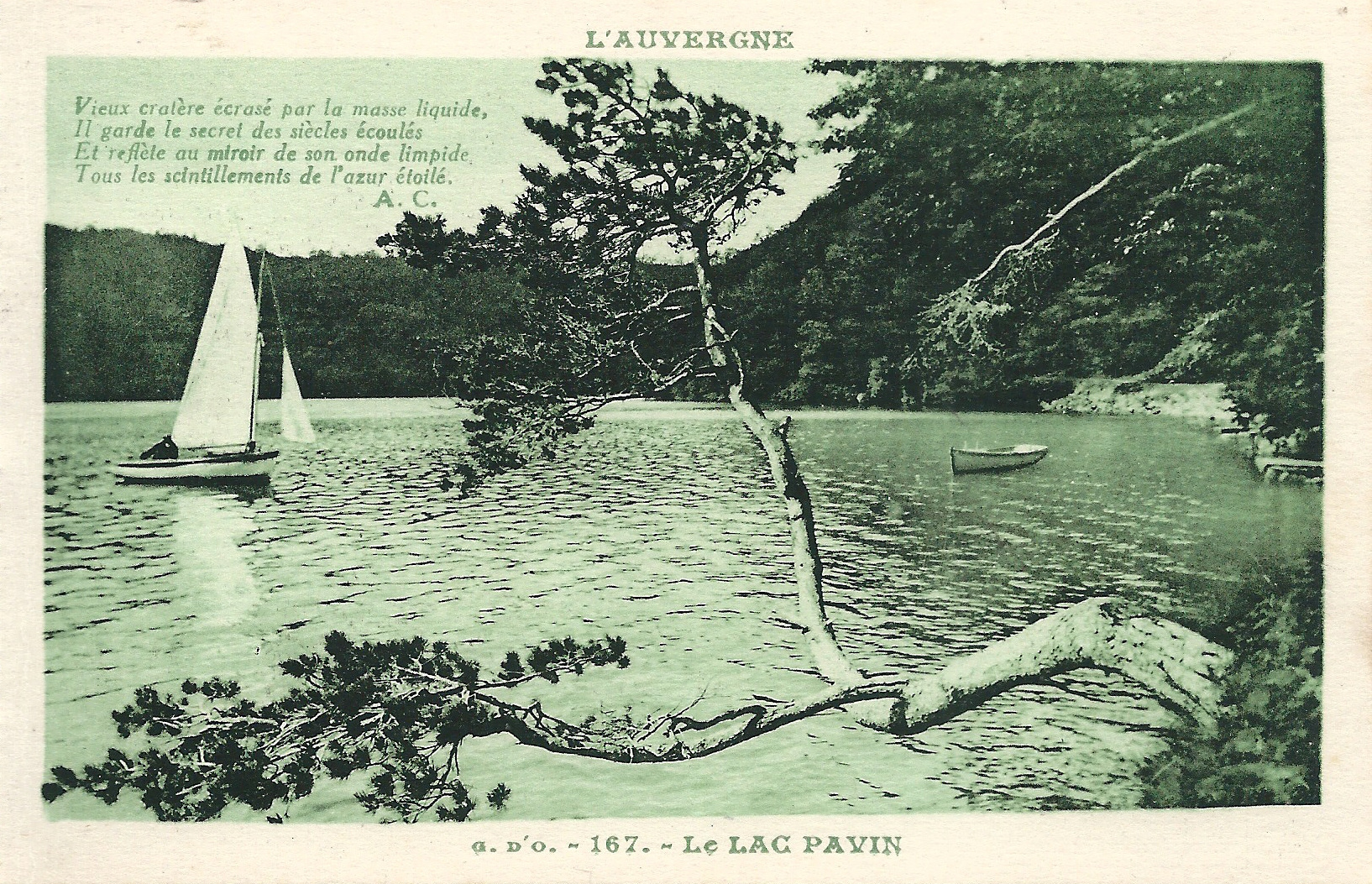

== See also ==
=== Bibliography ===
- Charles Bruyant, " The cuttlefish of Lake Pavin", Revue d'Auvergne, t. 20,1903, p. 81-97 (in French)
- T. Sime-Ngando, P. Boivin, E. Chapron, D. Jezequel and M. Meybeck, Lake Pavin: History, geology, biogeochemistry, and sedimentology of a deep meromictic maar lake, Springer, 2016, 406 pp., ISBN 978-3-319-39961-4, (in French)).

=== Related articles ===
- meromictic lake
- limnic eruption
- Messel pit
- Lake Monoun
- Lake Nyos
- Lake Kivu
- The fr:Couze Pavin river
