= Redoubt Lake =

Lake in the state of Alaska, United States

- Location within Alaska Location within North America
- Location: Baranof Island, Sitka City and Borough, Alaska, US
- Coordinates: 56°53′28″N 135°14′52″W
- Type: Glacial lake, Meromictic
- Primary outflows: Redoubt falls
- Basin countries: United States
- Max. length: 9 mi (14 km)
- Max. width: 1 mi (1.6 km)
- Surface area: 3,200 acres (13 km^{2})
- Average depth: 460 ft (140 m)
- Max. depth: 870 ft (270 m)
- Water volume: 1.79 km^{3} (0.43 cu mi)
- Surface elevation: 15 ft (4.6 m)

Redoubt Lake, or Kunaa Shak Áayi, is a long, narrow lake on Baranof Island, near Sitka, Alaska. It is located in a glacially-carved valley in Tongass National Forest. It was named Ozero Glubokoye, meaning "deep lake", in 1809 by the Russian navigator Ivan Vasilyev.

Redoubt Lake is one of the largest meromictic lakes in North America. Its water is fresh to a depth of 330 ft (100 m), below which is a dense, saltwater layer. The lake's maximum depth is 870 ft (270 m) with a mean depth of 460 ft (140 m). Its surface area covers 3,200 acres (13 km^{2}). It has been theorized that the lake was once a former fjord that was cut off from the ocean via isostatic rebound, leading to seawater being trapped.

In the early 19th century Redoubt Lake was part of Russian America. The Russians established a small settlement near the lake's outlet known variously as Ozersk Redoubt, Ozyorsk Redoubt, The Redoubt, Seleniye Dranishnikova, or Dranishnikov Settlement. Salmon traps were set in the lake and the catch was salted and dried at Ozersk Redoubt. Between 1817 and 1832 the Russians at Sitka and Ozersk Redoubt salted an average of 20,000 salmon annually.

Fish harvests by the Russians at Redoubt Lake sometimes exceeded 50,000 sockeye salmon per year. Annual escapements possibly exceeded 100,000 sockeye. In the 1980s, sockeye escapement or returns of adult fish had declined to an average less than 10,000 annually. Some years the numbers measured in the low hundreds.
