= Lake Fidler =

Lake in Tasmania, Australia

- Location in Tasmania
- Location: South West Tasmania
- Coordinates: 42°30′31″S 145°40′37″E
- Type: Meromictic
- Basin countries: Australia
- Designation: Tasmanian Wilderness World Heritage Site area

Lake Fidler is a meromictic lake beside the Gordon River in the Tasmanian Wilderness World Heritage Site area of the west coast of Tasmania, Australia. The lake has a layer of fresh water overlying an anoxic salt water layer. The meromictic lakes and ponds of the Gordon River were discovered by D. A. Hodgson and Professor Peter Tyler.

== Description ==
It became evident that, following the establishment of a hydro-electric power industry on the Gordon River, the flows of fresh water into the lake were disturbed and the anoxic salt layer was declining in depth. Previously, low river flows at certain times of the year allowed salt water to migrate upriver and occasionally spill into Lake Fidler through a narrow channel joining it to the river, thus recharging the salt water layer.

In 2004, Hydro Tasmania gained state and federal approval to recharge the lake with seawater drawn from the sea outside Macquarie Harbour at the mouth of the Gordon River. This involved having a sea-going tug draw up approximately 1.4 million litres (310×10^{3} imp gal; 370×10^{3} US gal) of salt water in lots of approximately 100,000 litres (22,000 imp gal; 26,000 US gal), and discharge the water through a diffuser that allowed the seawater to settle into the lower salt layer. (See diagrams at Hydro Tasmania press release, 18 June 2004) This was completed and the results confirmed in April 2005. However, it was noted that, if no natural recharging occurs, the process of recharging may need to be repeated in about 10–15 years.

== See also ==
- List of reservoirs and dams in Australia § Tasmania
- List of lakes of Australia § Tasmania
