= Heart Lake Conservation Area =

Protected area in Brampton, Ontario, Canada

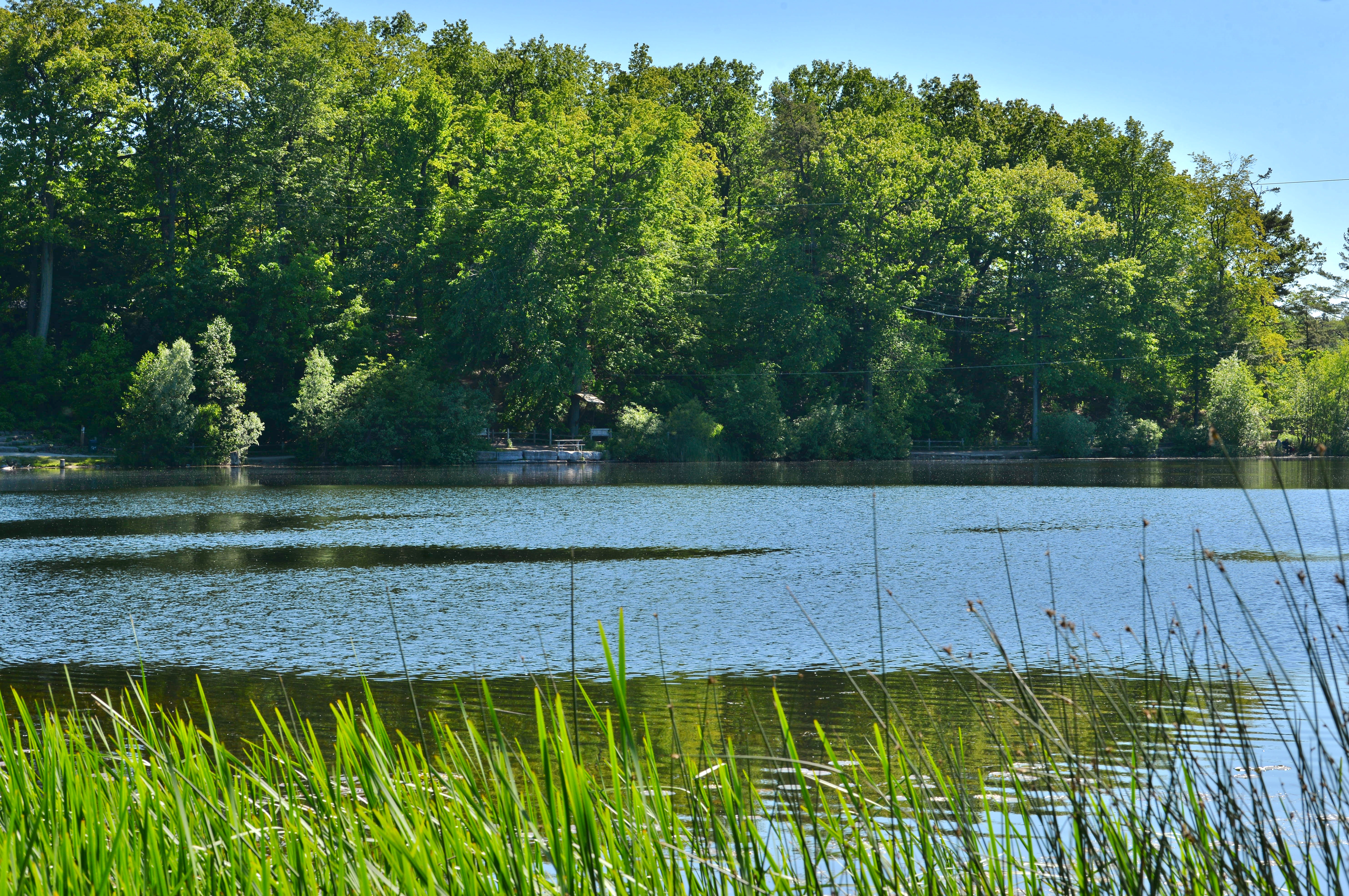
- Heart Lake at the Heart Lake Conservation Park
- Interactive map of Heart Lake Conservation Area
- Location: Brampton
- Coordinates: 43.742°N 79.795°W
- Website: trca.ca/parks/heart-lake-conservation-area/

Heart Lake Conservation Park (also referred to as Heart Lake Conservation Area, or HLCA) occupies 169 hectares (418 acres) in the Etobicoke Creek watershed, within the City of Brampton, Ontario. It is owned and managed by the Toronto and Region Conservation Authority (TRCA).

HLCA’s diverse ecosystem includes Heart Lake, the headwaters for Spring Creek, a wetland complex, one of the largest individual blocks of forest in the Etobicoke Creek watershed, and surficial geology of glacial till and river deposits.

HLCA offers many activities to the public, including hiking, fishing, swimming, Treetop Trekking and more. The conservation area is open to the public from the end of April to Thanksgiving weekend, weather permitting.

The opening of a Medicine Wheel Garden was celebrated May 20, 2010. It came as a vision from a male elder of the Anishnawbe Nation. Toronto and Region Conservation Authority, Peel Aboriginal Network, Heart Lake Community Action Area Group and the City of Brampton, created the Medicine Wheel Garden (Gitigaan Mashkiki).

== History ==
The conservation area was created when 63.3 hectares of land around and including Heart Lake was acquired by the Etobicoke Mimico Conservation Authority (TRCA's predecessor) in 1956 from property owner Allan E. Taylor. Heart Lake Conservation Area initially opened to the public in 1957. The initial intent was to acquire strategic lands around rivers and bodies of water for conservation purposes, and establish recreation properties such as parks, trails and natural lands that also doubled as flood control areas, one of a series of long-term flood mitigation efforts by local conservation authorities after the destruction caused by Hurricane Hazel in 1954.

Additional surrounding properties had been acquired by the TRCA and added to the conservation area by 1982, including some neighbouring wetlands.

The conservation area itself is made up of forest land (48%), wetlands (21%), and home to many different animal species. There was an underground Brampton Esker that ran through the area that was a source of water for the municipality until 1972, but has been diminished as it was mined for gravel aggregate deposits for many decades.

Heart Lake itself was originally called Snell's Lake, after one of the earlier property owners, John Snell, and the north lakes (Teapot Lake & Dyer's Lake) similarly used to be called Archdekin's Lake. All are kettle lakes.

== Hiking trails ==
Heart Lake Conservation Area is home to five hiking trails, with 11 km of trails in total. Pokémon Go stops have been added to TRCA parks including Heart Lake.

These include:

Trail	Length (km)
Peel Trail	3.8 km
Terry Fox Trail	3.2 km
Rayner Trail	0.7 km
Heart Lake - Esker Trail	2.8 km
Connector Trail	0.6 km

In spring 2017, a new fitness trail was added with strength training and enhanced stretching.

== Heart Lake ==
Heart Lake is the main focus of HLCA, offering users many water-based activities including fishing, boating and canoeing.

=== Fishing ===
HLCA offers visitors the ability to fish lakeside or from boats.

Heart Lake is stocked with rainbow trout, raised by TRCA at Glen Haffy Conservation Area’s Fish Hatchery each year. Other fish found in Heart Lake include bass and sunfish. During the summer, Heart Lake is one of the hosts for the Learn to Fish Program.

=== Boating ===
Visitors at HLCA can enjoy boating activities on Heart Lake. HLCA offers boat rentals on-site.

=== Cross country running ===
The ROPSSAA Cross Country Championships are hosted at Heart Lake annually towards the end of October.

In 2012, Heart Lake was the location of the OFSAA Cross Country Championships.

== Pool and Splash Pad ==
The Wild Wetland Splash and Pool Facility at HLCA includes an 840 sq metre, beach-entry swimming pool, with the deep end being 8 ft. in depth. Along with a heated swimming pool, the water facility also includes over thirty wetland-themed water features.

== Treetop Trekking ==
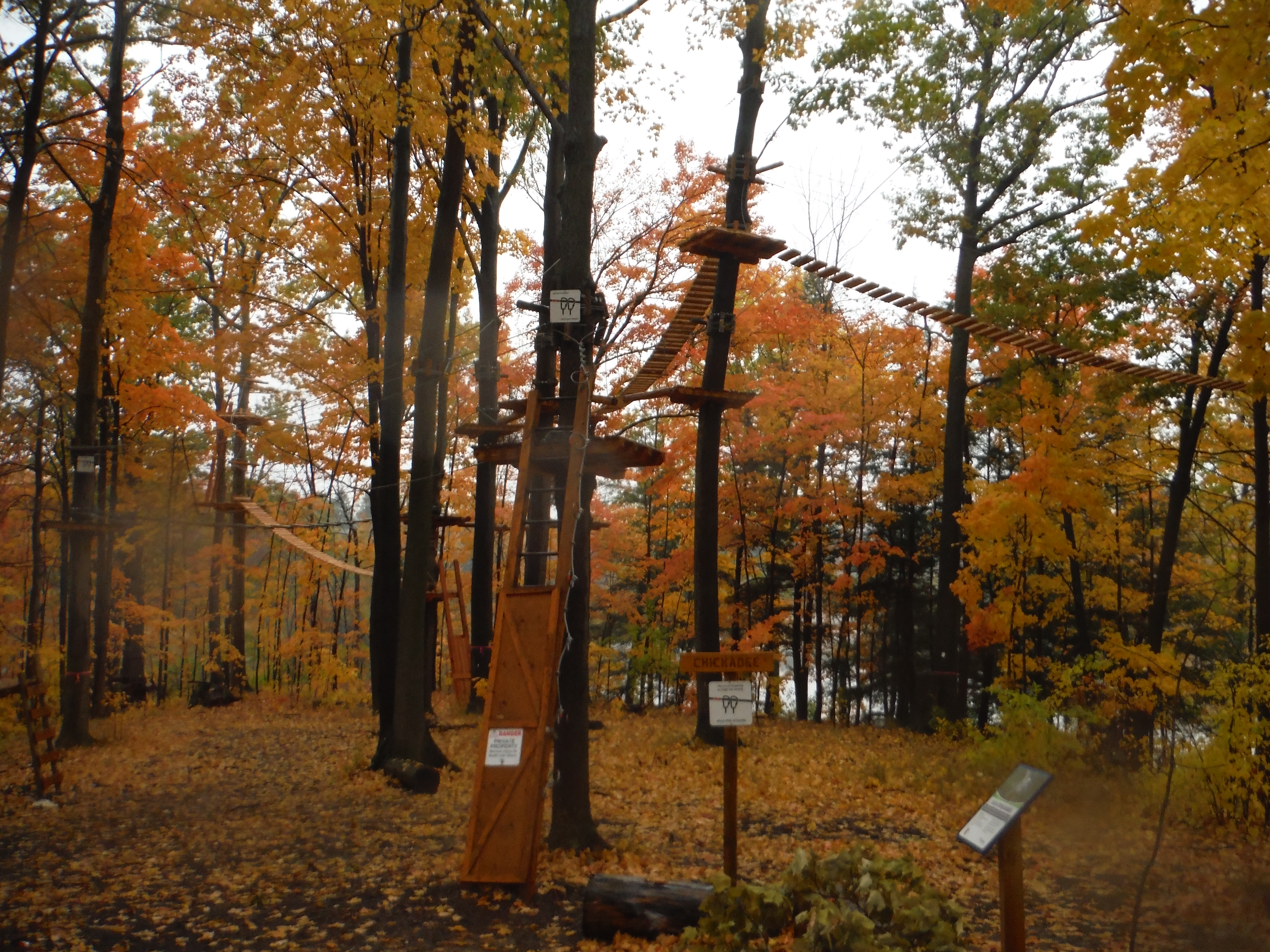
Treetop Trekking facilities at Heart Lake Conservation Area

Treetop Trekking Brampton is an aerial ropes and zip-line course located within HLCA. The course offers visitors 6 aerial courses, 7 zip lines and over 65 aerial games to enjoy.

The course became a part of HLCA in 2013.
