= Hot Lake (Washington) =

- Hot Lake as viewed from the north, 7 July 2011

- Location within Washington (state)
- Location: Okanogan County
- Coordinates: 48°58′23″N 119°28′35″W
- Type: meromictic lake
- Surface elevation: 1,939 feet (591 m)

Hot Lake is a hypersaline, meromictic lake located in extreme northern Okanogan County, Washington near Oroville, Washington. Occupying a small, glacially-carved basin surrounded by mafic magnesian rocks, dolomites, and shales containing deposits of pyrite and pyrrhotite minerals, Hot Lake is unusual among hypersaline lakes in that it is dominated by magnesium and sulfate as its major ions. Because of its mineralogy, Hot Lake was mined for epsomite, initially by the Stewart-Calvert Company during World War I, when the importation of epsomite from Germany was suspended. Major flora growing within the lake include Ruppia maritima and Chara, and the dominant fauna are the brine shrimp Artemia salina and Branchinecta campestris. A benthic phototrophic microbial mat dominated by cyanobacteria is also found within the lake.
