= Penang National Park =

National park in Malaysia

- Taman Negara Pulau Pinang 槟城国家公园 பினாங்கு தேசியப் பூங்காக்கள்
- IUCN category II (national park)
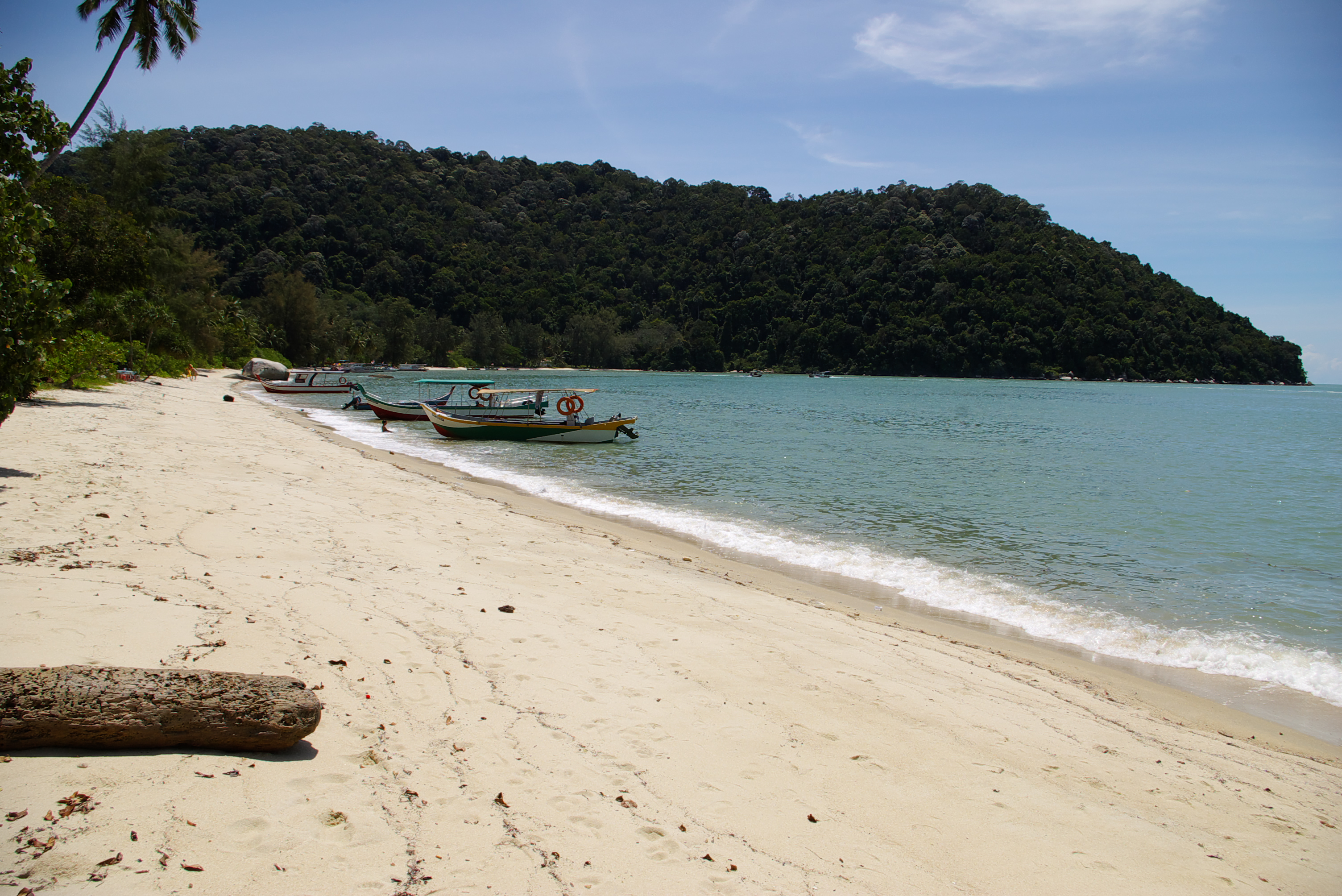
- Monkey Beach

- Location within Malaysia
- Location: Northwestern Penang island
- Nearest city: Teluk Bahang
- Coordinates: 5°26′53″N 100°11′36″E
- Area: 2,563 hectares (9.9 sq mi)
- Established: 2003
- Governing body: Department of Wildlife and National Parks Peninsular Malaysia (PERHILITAN)
- Website: Official website

Penang National Park (Malay: Taman Negara Pulau Pinang; تامن نݢارا ڤولاو ڤينڠ; Chinese: 槟城国家公园; Bīnchéng guójiā gōngyuán; Tamil: பினாங்கு தேசியப் பூங்காக்கள்; Piṉāṅku tēciyap pūṅkākkaḷ) is a national park in northwestern Malaysia that spans 1,213 ha of land and sea and is used by scientists, researchers, and nature lovers to explore its natural treasures.

Previously known as the Pantai Acheh Forest Reserve, it was declared the Penang National Park in April 2003.

The site, located at the northwestern tip of Penang Island, is known to harbour 417 flora and 143 fauna species.

Penang National Park is the first protected area legally gazetted under Malaysia's National Park Act of 1980, signifying the state and federal governments' environmental protection efforts. It was established to preserve flora and fauna as well as objects with geological, archaeological, historical, ethnological, scientific, and scenic interests.

Natural attractions of the park include hill/lowland dipterocarp forests, mangrove forest, sandy beach habitats, a seasonal meromictic lake, and open coastal seas. Stands of seraya (Shorea curtisii) trees, a common feature of coastal dipterocarp forests, can be seen on steep slopes around Muka Head. There are over 1,000 species of plants recorded, dominated by the families Dipterocarpaceae, Leguminosae, Apocynaceae, Anacardiaceae, Euphorbiaceae, and Moraceae.

== Ecology ==
Penang National Park includes five habitat types not found in other major Malaysian nature reserves. It is a haven for 417 flora and 143 fauna species, including turtles, crustaceans, and rare pitcher plants (Nepenthes spp.)

=== Flora ===
Secondary forest is the main feature in Penang National Park. This includes chengal, meranti seraya, jelutong, gaharu, tongkat ali, pelawan, bintangor, wild orchids, casuarina, sea almond, cashew nut, and coconut palms. Along the coast, there are screw pines, and various ferns spread between the trees. Mangrove forest is also plentiful in the park.

=== Fauna ===
Among animals spotted in and around the park are dolphins, hawksbill turtles, dusky leaf monkeys, and long-tailed macaques.

The park is also home to 46 species of birds, such as stork-billed kingfishers, white-breasted waterhens, and great egrets. Large birds such as white bellied sea eagles, brahminy kites, and kingfishers are occasionally reported.

Mammals such as wild boars, civets, smooth-coated otters, mouse deer, rats, bats, and squirrels are present, as are various crabs, fishes, prawns, monitor lizards, and snakes.

Life in the meromictic lake is scarce, since it is usually deprived of oxygen in the lower layers. The brackish water sustains Faunus ater snails.

Pantai Kerachut beach is a common nesting place for green turtles from April to August, and olive ridley sea turtles from September to February.

== Beaches ==
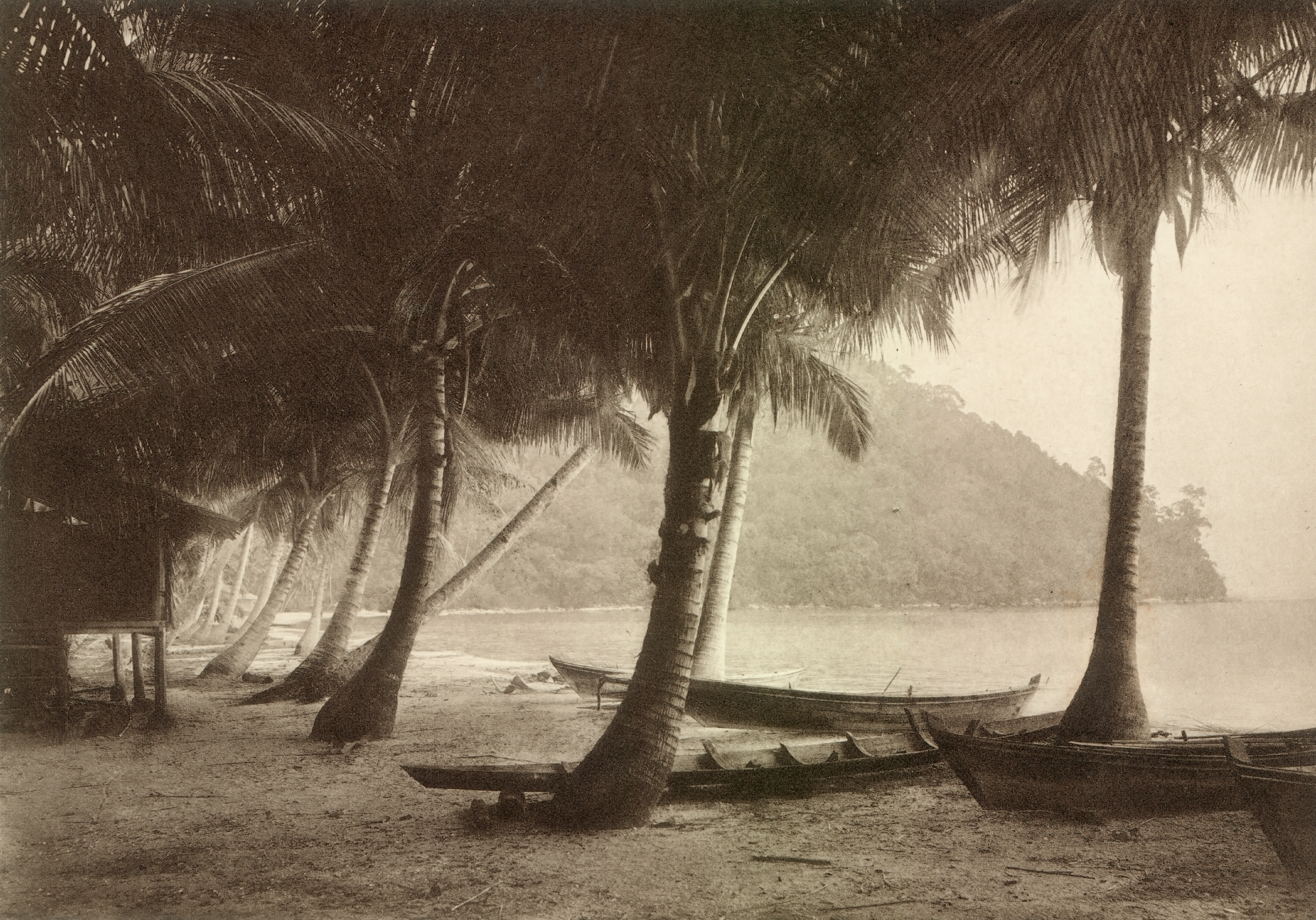
Coast near Muka Head on Penang island, 1910

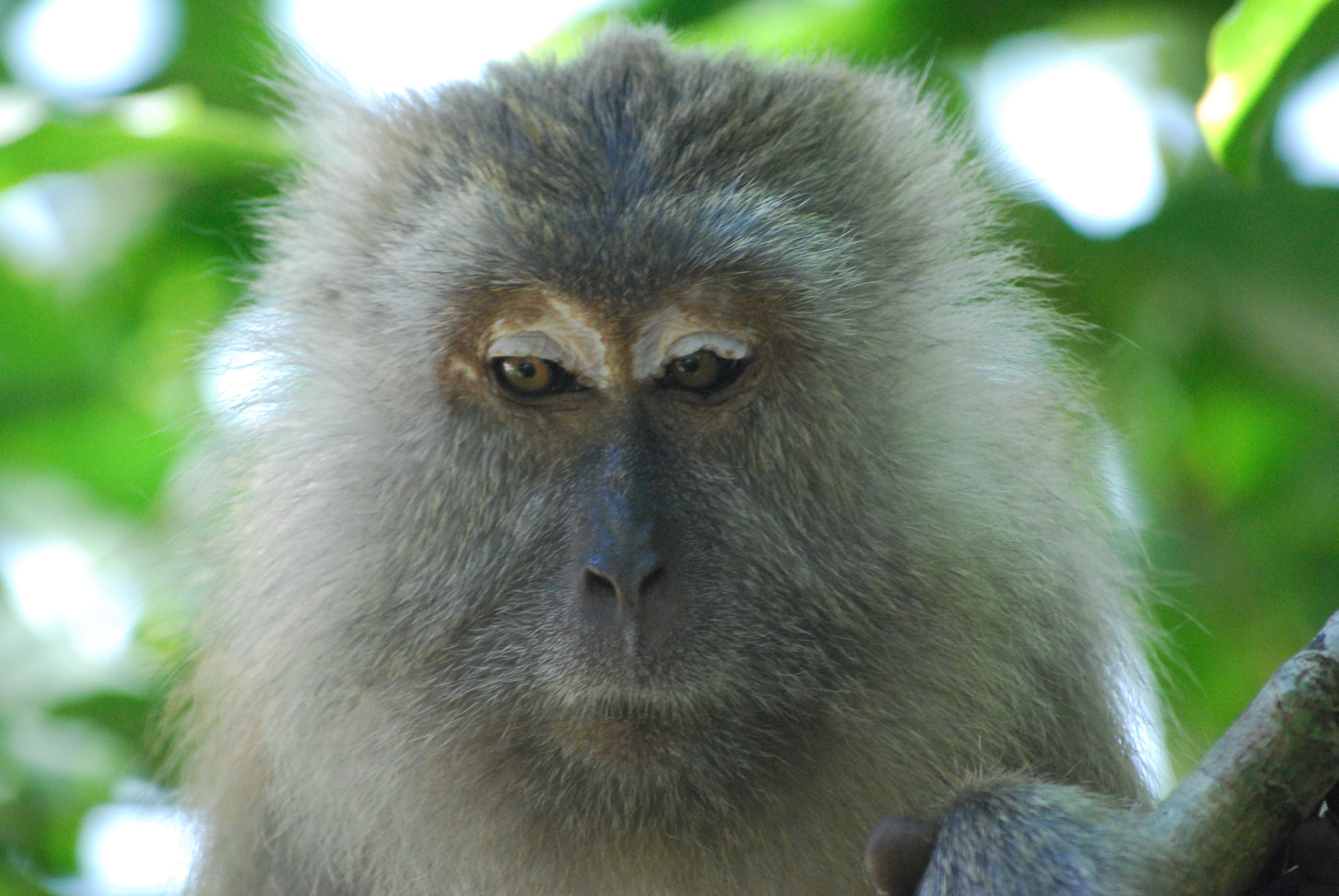
Crab-eating macaque on Monkey Beach

- Teluk Bahang
- Pasir Pandak
- Teluk Tukun
- Tanjung Ailing
- Teluk Duyung (Monkey Beach)
- Teluk Ketapang
- Pantai Kerachut
- Teluk Kampi
- Pantai Mas
