= Hot Lake (Humboldt County, Nevada) =

- Location within Nevada
- Location: Humboldt County, Nevada
- Coordinates: 41°58′52″N 118°42′08″W
- Type: lake

Hot Lake is a lake in the U.S. state of Nevada.

Hot Lake was named for the fact hot springs empty into it.
